= Paul Light =

Paul Light may refer to:

- Paul Light (psychologist), British psychologist and the first vice-chancellor of the University of Winchester
- Paul C. Light, American political scientist
