= University of Winchester =

Public university in Hampshire, England

- Coat of arms
- Former name: King Alfred's College
- Motto: Old English: Wisdom ond lar
- Motto in English: Wisdom and Knowledge
- Type: Public research university
- Established: 1840 - Winchester Diocesan Training School; 1847 - Winchester Training College; 1928 - King Alfred's College; 2005 - University of Winchester
- Affiliations: Guild HE; Cathedrals Group; Association of Commonwealth Universities; Universities UK
- Chancellor: Hugh Dennis
- Vice-Chancellor: Sarah Greer
- Administrative staff: 650
- Students: 6,840 (2024/25)
- Undergraduates: 5,880 (2024/25)
- Postgraduates: 965 (2024/25)
- Location: Winchester, Hampshire, England
- Campus: Semi-urban
Colours
- Nickname: UoW
- Website: winchester.ac.uk

The University of Winchester is a public research university based in the city of Winchester, Hampshire, England. The university has origins tracing back to 1840 as a teacher training college, but was established in 2005.

Winchester University is a member of The Cathedrals Group (officially the Council of Church Universities and Colleges or CCUC), an association of universities and university colleges in the United Kingdom.

Every year the university holds its graduation ceremonies in Winchester Cathedral.

Graduates of the University of Winchester may use the post-nominals Winton., from the Latin Wintoniensis meaning 'of Winchester'.

== History ==
The main building of the University of Winchester

The origins of the University of Winchester date back to 1840 when the Winchester Diocesan Training School was founded as a Church of England foundation for the training of elementary schoolmasters. The school was initially quite small, located in a house at 27 St Swithun Street, Winchester. In 1847 the school moved to Wolvesey, the Bishop's Palace, where it became Winchester Training College. Following an outbreak of cholera at Wolvesey a new building (now the main building on the university's King Alfred Campus) was established for the college in 1862, on land granted by the cathedral at West Hill, Winchester. The college was renamed King Alfred's College in 1928.

King Alfred's College trained thousands of teachers, at first men only, and then women too from 1960 onwards. Following changes in UK government policy towards further and higher education in the early 1970s, the college looked for partners to merge with and also sought to diversify its provision. Its educational partner, the University of Southampton, was lukewarm about offering other degrees, and the college sought approval for its own BEd and then BA degrees from the Council for National Academic Awards (CNAA). Interdisciplinary degrees in History and English with Drama, Archaeology and American Studies were the first offered. Further programmes followed in the 1980s, but it was only when the college expanded in the early 1990s following CNAA approval for a modular degree programme that a large number of new fields of study grew at undergraduate level. At the same time Masters programmes were approved alongside an MEd programme. With the CNAA's demise in 1992, the college found itself once again accredited by the University of Southampton, resuming a partnership broken off 18 years earlier.

When in 1995 the UK government published criteria by which colleges of higher education could become universities, King Alfred's under its Principal, John Dickinson, set itself the target of becoming a university by 2005 by first acquiring Taught and then later Research Degree Awarding Powers.

Paul Light, Principal from 2000, led the institution through the successful application for Taught Degree Awarding Powers in 2003 and a change of name to University College Winchester in 2004. His leadership culminated in the award of university title in 2005, achieving the target set 10 years earlier and entitling him to be the first Vice-Chancellor of the University of Winchester. In August 2008 the university was given the power to award research degrees.

=== 2006–present ===
Professor Joy Carter became Vice-Chancellor in April 2006. In the period since, the university has seen significant development. On Tuesday, 29 January 2013, His Royal Highness the Earl of Wessex officially inaugurated the new "state-of-the-art learning and teaching building, St. Alphege" at the University of Winchester.

The new University Centre opened in 2007, which includes the Student Union and forms the focus of the campus, providing facilities for the whole university community. The Royal Institute of British Architects (RIBA) awarded the University Centre the RIBA Award for the South region in 2008 in recognition of its high architectural standards.

The Winchester Sports Stadium, which opened in 2008, cost £3.5 million and includes an Olympic standard 8-lane running track and supporting field events and an all-weather astro turf suitable for hockey and football.

In 2013, the new St Alphege building received a RIBA regional award. The new Learning and Teaching Building provided additional state-of-the-art teaching spaces for lectures and group study and adjoins the existing 1970s St Edburga Building with a glazed atrium link. The new buildings combine to form a new landscaped piazza space fronting the Sparkford Road entrance.

In 2018, work began on the expansion of the West Downs campus, to include new lecture and exhibition spaces. This was completed by September 2020, a year after the scheduled completion date.

== Campus ==
The University Centre opened in 2007

The University Centre food hall

=== The King Alfred Campus ===
The main University Campus, King Alfred, is located close to the city centre of Winchester. Some of the buildings on this campus are named after former staff or governors. The Tom Atkinson and Herbert Jarman buildings are named after former staff and the Kenneth Kettle and Fred Wheeler Buildings are named after long-standing governors. Others are named after Anglo-Saxon saints: St Alphege, St Edburga, St Grimbald and St Swithun and St Elizabeth's. The Martial Rose Library is named after a former Principal. A subsidiary campus, home to the Winchester Business School and West Downs Centre, is located a short distance away at the West Downs site. A smaller third section of the university, known as the Medecroft Quarter, is located just off the King Alfred Campus and contains extra learning facilities.

=== Recent and future campus development ===
Major redevelopment has taken place in recent years to modernise the campus. In 2007, work finished on the University Centre on site of the former refectory, at a cost of £9 million. The building includes a new Student Union, a cafe and bar, and a nightclub as well as catering facilities, main reception, a bookshop, a mini-mart convenience store and a social learning space in the WiFi-equipped Learning Café. It was designed by architects Design Engine.

In 2010, a new several-storey student residence, Queens Road, was completed. In 2012, St. Alphege, a new teaching block which contains state-of-the-art teaching spaces, was opened. Work also finished on providing the university library with six new private study rooms for student use. In 2013, the Burma Road Student Village finished construction, providing the university with five blocks that make up a third student village, including a gym and an extra laundry room. In 2013, the Kenneth Kettle building was converted into a social learning space and cafe known as Cyber Italia.

The redevelopment of the university's sports grounds at Bar End in Winchester was completed in 2008 after Sport England formally pledged the funding required for the project's completion, in partnership with Winchester City Council. The facilities at Bar End include an Olympic-standard 400m eight-lane athletics track with supporting field events, an all-weather hockey and general sports pitch, floodlighting and an extended pavilion.

The university's new West Downs Centre opened in September 2020. The new project was built on undeveloped land within the West Downs site next to the Grade-II-listed Winchester Business School and West Downs Student Village. It provides state-of-the-art teaching and learning facilities, a new library, a gallery, multiple shops and cafes, a variety of social learning spaces, and a 250-seat drum-shaped auditorium, and is also home to the university's new computer and digital-related degree programmes. The initial completion date was set for 2019, and then early 2020; however, this was pushed back to the start of the 2020–21 academic year following the COVID-19 pandemic. For the 2022–23 academic year, a new eco-friendly store, The Pantry, was opened on the West Downs campus, accessible to both students and staff, as well as members of the general public. A statue of the climate change activist Greta Thunberg was placed outside the building, but was moved to an internal courtyard in 2023.

In 2025, the University opened it's renovated Martial Rose Library. The Library was opened by the then-current chancellor and vice-chancellor Hugh Dennis and Sarah Greer. The project was initiated to reflect the adapting needs of students, staff and the academic needs of the Library.

== Arms ==
Coat of arms of University of Winchester
Notes Granted 29 August 2008 by the College of Arms. Crest A castle triple-towered Argent each tower enfiling a Saxon crown Gules. Torse Argent and Sable. Escutcheon Chequy Or and Gules on a chief Sable an open book Proper bound and between two lions passant guardant combatant Or. Supporters On either side a boar Argent spined and unguled Or in the mouth a rose Gules barbed seeded slipped and leaved Or. Motto Wisdom Ond Lar

The motto (Wisdom-ond-lar, from old English, translating to Wisdom and Knowledge in Modern English), was inspired by the preface of King Alfred's translation into Old English, during the late 9th century, of Pope Gregory the Great's Regula Pastoralis, which frequently refers to both wisdom and knowledge. Alfred's translation of Regula Pastoralis was instrumental in the pursuit to improve education in Anglo-Saxon England.

== Organisation and administration ==
Winchester's academic structure consists of four faculties and a Degree Apprenticeship Programme, each home to teaching and learning in a wide-ranging variety of subject areas such as:

=== Faculty of Education and Arts ===
- Acting
- Digital Media Design and Immersive Technologies
- Education and Early Years Education
- Film Production
- Journalism
- Media and Communication
- Music and Sound Production
- Musical Theatre
- Popular Music Performance
- Primary Education with QTS (Teacher Training)

=== Faculty of Business and Digital Technologies ===
- Accounting, Finance and Economics
- Business Management
- Computer Science
- Cyber Security
- Event Management
- Fashion Business & Marketing
- Marketing
- Software Engineering

=== Faculty of Law, Crime and Justice ===
- Criminology
- Forensics
- Law
- Professional Policing

=== Faculty of Health and Wellbeing ===
- Animal Science and Conservation
- Childhood and Youth Studies
- Health and Social Care
- Midwifery
- Nursing
- Nutrition and Dietetics
- Physiotherapy
- Social Work
- Sport and Exercise
- Sports Therapy

=== Faculty of Humanities and Social Sciences ===
- Animal Welfare & Society
- Anthropology
- Archaeology
- Ancient, Classical and Medieval Studies
- Classical Studies
- Creative Writing
- English Literature
- Film Studies
- Geography
- History
- Philosophy, Religion and Ethics
- Politics with International Relations
- Psychology
- Sociology

=== Degree apprenticeships ===
- Midwifery
- Nursing (Mental Health)
- Nursing (Adult)
- Nursing (Child)
- Nursing Associate
- Nursing (Learning Disabilities)
- Occupational Therapy
- Social Work

=== Governance ===
Hugh Dennis is the current Chancellor of the university and was appointed in 2024, succeeding Alan Titchmarsh who held the role between 2014 and 2021. The first Chancellor of the university was Dame Mary Fagan, the former Lord-Lieutenant of Hampshire, appointed in 2005.

Vice-Chancellors for the University of Winchester
Vice-Chancellor	Years in Occupant	Notes
Paul Light	2005 - 2006	Appointed in 2000 as Principal of King Alfred's College
Joy Carter	2006 - 2021	
Elizabeth Stuart	2021	Interim Vice-Chancellor
Sarah Greer	2022 - 2026	
Ian Pickup	2026 - Present	

== Programmes ==
A boarding college, Winchester Shoei College at the University of Winchester (formerly the Shoei Centre at King Alfred's College), is an affiliate of the Shoei Gakuin. It opened in 1982. As of 1983, at one time circa 40 students, all female and aged 18–20, were a part of this programme. They took special courses in British studies and English Language Teaching (ELT).

== Academic profile ==
=== Reputation and rankings ===
Rankings
National rankings
- Complete (2027): 98
- Guardian (2027): 106
- Times / Sunday Times (2027): 106

Global rankings
- THE (2026): 1201–1500

Winchester is ranked the 98th (of 130) best university in the UK by the Complete University Guide Rankings, 115th (of 121) in the Guardian Rankings, and 103rd (of 130) by the Times / Sunday Times. Winchester received an overall silver award in the 2023 Teaching Excellence Framework, which indicates that "the university is of high quality and regularly exceeds the baseline quality expected of higher education institutions". Winchester first appeared on the THE in 2023, ranked in the 801-1000 bracket.

=== Research standing ===
In the most recent Research Excellence Framework (REF 2014), 82 per cent of research was considered to be recognised internationally.

== Student life ==
=== Winchester Student Union ===
Winchester Student Union is an organisation run for and by the students of The University of Winchester. Established in the 1960s, it has been known as both King Alfred's College Students' Union and King Alfred's Student Union. The not-for-profit charitable organisation, which is funded by a university grant and commercial services revenues, became known as Winchester Student Union in June 2004, and continues as the main representational body for all students. The National Student Survey 2015 ranked Winchester Student Union 7th out of 108 universities in England, and it retained this position through 2020.

The Student Union is based in the University Centre and has a 550 capacity venue that includes the Vault nightclub, a cinema screen, three bars, one of which doubling as a cafe serving Costa Coffee during the day, and the main shop on campus. A smaller shop is also based in the West Downs Student Village. BOP and Ctrl Alt Dlt are regular events held at the Vault during the semester, as well as seasonal club nights (Halloween and Christmas being popular examples), and a variety of smaller ones also taking place. Other events run by the Student Union include weekly quiz nights, movie screenings and cocktail nights, pop-up shops and clothing swaps, karaoke nights, society-organised events, and a range of seasonal activities.

Winchester Student Union is home to the many societies and representational networks on campus, and it runs over 40 sports teams, including football, netball, hockey, the Rugby Union, Rugby Sevens, tennis and basketball teams. The majority of the teams take part in BUSA, SESSA or local leagues.

All student media are the responsibility of the Student Union, except for the weekly internet bulletins released, produced, and created by "Winchester News Online" or WINOL, as part of the BA Journalism course.

==== Democracy and governance ====
All students of the university are automatically members of the union, though are able to opt out if they choose. Every year the student body elects two presidents (student engagement & student voice), they are full-time sabbatical officers. There are also permanent staff.

The Union provides welfare, academic advice and representation to students. The Union can also support student appeals to the university.

Winchester Student Union is affiliated to the National Union of Students (NUS).

Winchester Student Union is currently ranked as one of greenest student unions within Britain, as measured by its Gold ranking in the NUS award system entitled: Green Impact: Unions. In 2012, 2013 and 2014, Winchester Student Union won NUS's national 'Best Bar None' competition, cementing its status as one of the best student union venues in the country.

==== Sound Radio ====
Sound Radio, the Student Union's radio station, was set up on 10 June 2011, before launching as an official society in September. The station briefly was broadcast on 87.7FM, before becoming predominantly an internet station. Sound Radio rebranded as Venta Radio in 2013, but this was then reversed after a failed attempt at becoming a full-time community FM station.

Broadcasting from their studio inside the Student Union building, Sound Radio streams live on the Winchester Student Union website. Shows are broadcast on weekdays during term time, and occasionally on weekends. All shows are live and presented by members of the Student Union.

Sound Radio is an active member of the Student Radio Association (SRA), after joining in early 2017. The station regularly participates in the SRA Chart Show, which broadcasts every Sunday from 2 pm until 4 pm.

In 2018, Sound Radio won SRA Silver Award for Best Chart Show. They also won Most Improved Student Radio Station at the I Love Student Radio Awards 2019.

=== Halls of residence ===
A variety of student accommodation is available across the University's campuses, and range from self-catered en-suite rooms to catered shared facilities. These include:

- West Downs Student Village
- Alwyn Hall
- St Elizabeth's Hall
- Beech Glade
- Queens Road Student Village
- Burma Road Student Village

External university-managed housing options, such as the Unilife building on Sparkford Road, Cathedral Point, and various houses off-campus are also available.

== Notable people ==
=== Academic staff ===
- Imruh Bakari – Film maker and writer. Head of Film Studies.
- June Boyce-Tillman – Professor of Applied Music, and MBE
- Martin Day – Screenwriter and novelist
- Michael Hicks – Emeritus Professor of Medieval History
- Elizabeth Stuart – Professor of Christian Theology and Vice Chancellor
- Judy Waite – Writer of children's fiction
- Richard Werner – Economist, Professor of Banking and author of Princes of the Yen
- Barbara Yorke – Emerita Professor of Early Medieval History

=== Alumni ===
- Martin Bashir – ex-television journalist
- Stuart Brennan – BAFTA-winning actor, writer and film producer
- Mike Bushell – BBC television journalist
- Sara Coburn – BBC business presenter
- Lauren Cohan – American-British actress
- Mark Diacono – food writer, grower and photographer
- Claire Fuller – novelist
- Steve Furst – comic actor
- Geoff Hampton – school principal
- Nick Helm – comedian
- Mark Johnson – horse racing commentator
- Demi Jones - television personality
- Shappi Khorsandi – comedian
- Dirk Maggs – radio producer
- Jill Marshall – writer
- Andrew Norriss – children's book author and TV sitcom writer
- Adam Pacitti - YouTuber
- Jonathan Pointing – actor and comedian (Plebs)
- David Prosho – actor and performer
- Angus Scott – television journalist and lecturer in journalism
- Anne Snelgrove – former Labour MP for South Swindon
- Bob Taylor – past president of the Rugby Football Union
- Stephanie Twell - middle- and long-distance runner, bronze medal winner in 1500 metres at 2010 Commonwealth Games

== See also ==
- Armorial of UK universities
- College of Education
- List of universities in the UK
- Winchester Student Union
