= Money creation =

Process by which the money supply of an economic region is increased

Money creation, or money issuance, is the process by which the money supply of a country or economic region is increased. In most modern economies, both central banks and commercial banks create money. Central banks issue money as a liability, typically called reserve deposits, which is available only for use by central bank account holders. These account holders are generally large commercial banks and foreign central banks.

Central banks can increase the quantity of reserve deposits directly by making loans to account holders, purchasing assets from account holders, or by recording an asset (such as a deferred asset) and directly increasing liabilities. However, the majority of the money supply that the public uses for conducting transactions is created by the commercial banking system in the form of commercial bank deposits. Bank loans issued by commercial banks expand the quantity of bank deposits.

Money creation occurs when the amount of loans issued by banks increases relative to the repayment and default of existing loans. Governmental authorities, including central banks and other bank regulators, can use various policies—mainly setting short-term interest rates—to influence the amount of bank deposits that commercial banks create.

== Monetary policy ==
The monetary authority of a nation—typically its central bank—influences the economy by creating and destroying liabilities on its balance sheet with the intent to change the supply of money available for conducting transactions and generating income. The policy that defines how the central bank changes its ledger to reduce or increase the amount of money in the economy available for banks to conduct transactions is known as monetary policy.

If the central bank is charged by law with maintaining price or employment levels in the economy, monetary policy may include reducing the money supply during times of high inflation to increase unemployment. The hope is that reducing employment will also reduce spending on goods and services that exhibit increasing prices. Monetary policy directly impacts the availability and cost of commercial bank deposits in the economy, which in turn impacts investment, stock prices, private consumption, demand for money, and overall economic activity. A country's exchange rate influences the value of its net exports.

In most developed countries, central banks conduct their monetary policy within an inflation targeting framework, whereas the monetary policies of most developing countries' central banks target some kind of fixed exchange rate system. Central banks operate in practically every nation in the world, with few exceptions. There are also groups of countries for which a single entity acts as their central bank, such as the organization of states of Central Africa, which have a common central bank (the Bank of Central African States), or monetary unions, such as the Eurozone. In the Eurozone, nations retain their respective central banks yet submit to the policies of a central entity, the European Central Bank.

Central banks conduct monetary policy by setting an interest rate paid on central bank deposit liabilities, directly purchasing or selling assets to change the amount of deposits on their balance sheet, or by signaling to the market through speeches and written guidance an intent to change the interest rate on deposits or to purchase or sell assets in the future.

Lowering interest rates by reducing the amount of interest paid on central bank liabilities or purchasing assets like bank loans and government bonds for higher prices (which results in an increase in bank reserve deposits on the central bank ledger) is called monetary expansion or monetary easing. In contrast, raising rates by paying more interest on central bank liabilities is known as monetary contraction or tightening (which results in a decrease of bank reserve deposits on the central bank ledger). An extraordinary process of monetary easing (keeping rates low) is denoted as quantitative easing, which involves the central bank purchasing large amounts of assets for high prices over an extended period.

=== Money supply ===
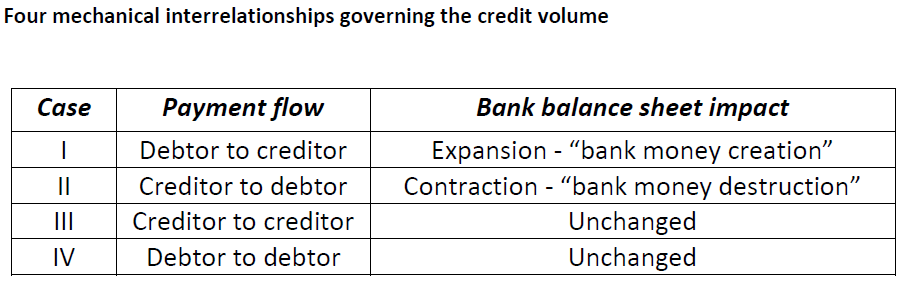
In accordance with "credit mechanics," bank money expansion or destruction (or lack of change) depends on payment flows.

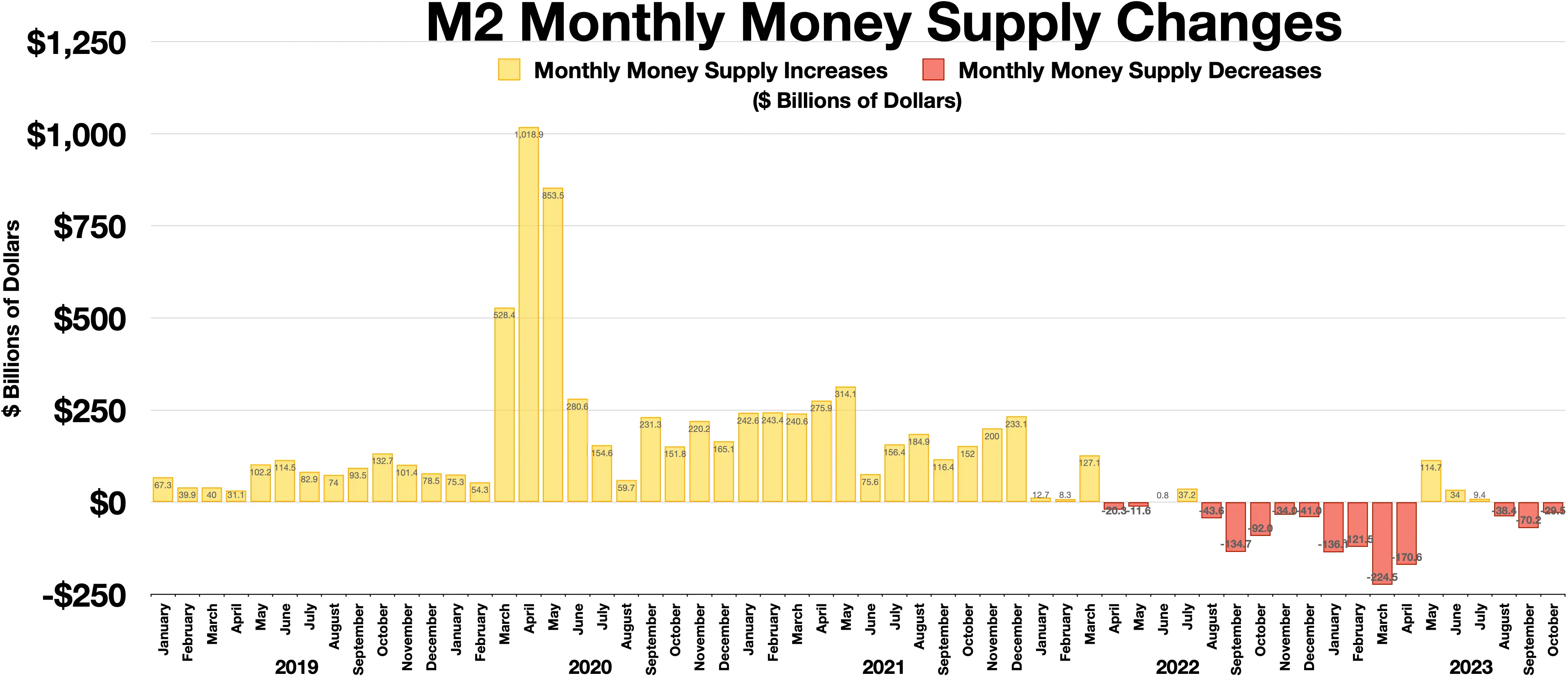
M2 monthly money supply changes

The term "money supply" commonly denotes the total, safe, financial assets that households and businesses can use to make payments or to hold as short-term investments. The money supply is measured using so-called "monetary aggregates," which are defined based on their respective levels of liquidity. In the United States, for example:

- M0: The total of all physical currency, including coinage. Using the United States dollar as an example, M0 = Federal Reserve notes + US notes + coins. It is not relevant whether the currency is held inside or outside of the private banking system as reserves.
- M1: The total amount of M0 (cash/coin) outside of the private banking system plus the amount of demand deposits, travelers' checks and other checkable deposits.
- M2: M1 + most savings accounts, money market accounts, retail money market mutual funds, and small denomination time deposits (certificates of deposit under $100,000).

In most countries, the central bank, treasury, or other designated state authority is empowered to mint new physical currency, usually taking the form of metal coinage or paper banknotes. While the value of major currencies was once backed by the gold standard, the end of the Bretton Woods system in 1971 led to all major currencies becoming fiat money—backed by a mutual agreement of value rather than a commodity.

Various measures are taken to prevent counterfeiting, including the use of serial numbers on banknotes and the minting of coinage using an alloy at or above its face value. Currency may be demonetized for a variety of reasons, including loss of value over time due to inflation, redenomination of its face value due to hyperinflation, or its replacement as legal tender by another currency. The currency-issuing government agency typically works with commercial banks to distribute freshly minted currency and retrieve worn currency for destruction, enabling the reuse of serial numbers on new banknotes.

In modern economies, physical currency consists of only a fraction of the broad money supply. (Note: For example, in December 2010, in the United States, of the $8.853 trillion broad money supply (M2, table 1), only about 10% (or $915.7 billion, table 3) consisted of coins and paper money. See Statistic, FRS) In the United Kingdom, gross bank deposits outweigh the physical currency issued by the central bank by a factor of more than 30 to 1. The United States, with a currency used substantially in legal and illicit international transactions, has a lower ratio of 8 to 1.

=== Debt monetization ===
Debt monetization is a term used to describe central bank money creation for use by government fiscal authorities, such as the U.S. Treasury. In many states, such as Great Britain, all government spending is always financed by central bank money creation. Debt monetization as a concept is often based on a misunderstanding of modern financial systems compared to fixed exchange rate systems like the gold standard.

Historically, in a fixed exchange rate financial system, central bank money creation directly for government spending by the fiscal authority was prohibited by law in many countries. However, in modern financial systems, central banks and fiscal authorities work closely together to manage interest rates and economic stability. This involves the creation and destruction of deposits on the central bank ledger to ensure that transactions can settle so that short-term interest rates do not exceed specified targets.

In the Eurozone, Article 123 of the Lisbon Treaty explicitly prohibits the European Central Bank from financing public institutions and state governments. In Japan, the nation's central bank "routinely" purchases approximately 70% of state debt issued each month, and as of Oct 2018, owns approximately 440 trillion yen (approximately $4 trillion) (Note: At a $1=¥0.0094 conversion rate) or over 40% of all outstanding government bonds.

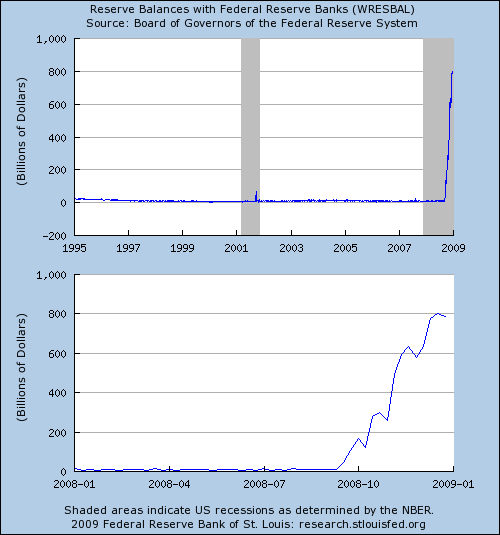
Reserve Balances with w:U.S. Federal Reserve Banks, Weekly, 1995-2008 in Billions of Dollars

In the United States, the 1913 Federal Reserve Act allowed federal banks to purchase short-term securities directly from the Treasury to facilitate its cash-management operations. The Banking Act of 1935 prohibited the central bank from directly purchasing Treasury securities and permitted their purchase and sale only "in the open market". In 1942, during wartime, Congress amended the Banking Act's provisions to allow purchases of government debt by the federal banks, with the total amount they would hold not to exceed $5 billion. After the war, the exemption was renewed with time limitations until it was allowed to expire in June 1981. Today, primary dealers in the United States are required to purchase all Treasuries at auction, and the U.S. central bank will create any quantity of reserve deposits necessary to settle the auction transaction.

=== Open market operations ===
Central banks can purchase or sell assets in the market, which is referred to as open market operations. When a central bank purchases assets from market participants, such as commercial banks that hold accounts at the central bank, reserve deposits are credited to the commercial banks' accounts and asset ownership is transferred to the central bank. In this way, the central bank can modulate the amount of reserve deposits in the financial system by exchanging financial assets like bonds for reserve deposits. For example, in the United States, when the Federal Reserve permanently purchases a security, the office responsible for implementing purchases and sales (The New York Fed's Open Market Trading Desk) buys eligible securities from primary dealers at prices determined in a competitive auction. The Federal Reserve pays for those securities by crediting the reserve accounts of the correspondent banks of the primary dealers. (The correspondent banks, in turn, credit the dealers' bank accounts.) In this way, the open market purchase leads to an increase in reserve balances.

Conversely, sales of assets by the U.S. central bank reduce reserve balances, which reduces the amount of money available in the financial system for settling transactions between member banks. Central banks also engage in short term contracts to "sell-assets-now, repurchase-later" to manage short-term reserve deposit balances. These contracts, known as repo (repurchase) contracts, are short-term (often overnight) contracts that are continually rolled over until some desired result in the financial system is achieved. Operations conducted by central banks can address either short-term goals on the bank's agenda or long-term factors such as maintaining financial stability or maintaining a floor and/or ceiling around a targeted interest rate for reserve deposits.

=== Money multiplier ===
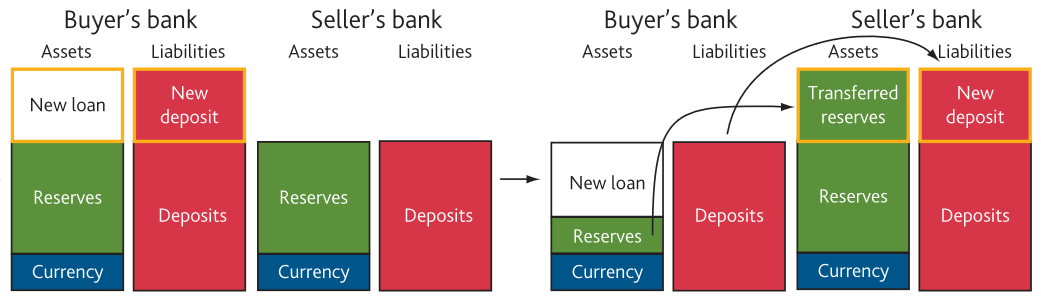
Left: Balance Sheet Extension of giving loan bank, right side: Balance Sheet Contraction of giving loan bank by losing reserves (transferring to seller´s bank).

Historical explanations of money creation often focused on the concept of a money multiplier, where reserve deposits or an underlying commodity such as gold were multiplied by bank lending of those deposits or gold balances to a maximum limit defined by the reserve requirement for money lenders. Thus, the total money supply was a function of the reserve requirement. Many states today, however, have no reserve requirement. The money multiplier has thus largely been abandoned as an explanatory tool for the money creation process.

When commercial banks lend money today, they expand the amount of bank deposits in the economy. The banking system can expand the money supply of a country far beyond the amount of reserve deposits created by the central bank. This means that, contrary to popular belief, most money is not created by central banks. Some argue that banks are limited in the total amount they can lend by their capital adequacy ratios and, in countries that impose required reserve ratios, by required reserves.

Bank capital, used for calculating the capital adequacy ratio, consists of assets on the bank balance sheet in excess of liabilities, with values further refined by regulation such as the international regulatory framework for banks, Basel III. Banks create capital by creating loans (assets) and destroying bank liabilities, which occurs when loans are repaid. This process increases bank equity, enabling banks to create commercial bank deposit liabilities (money) for their own use. In this way, banks create and manage their own capital levels. Because accounting conventions define the value of any given asset or liability, bank capital is a subjective measure that many argue is open to manipulation and may be a poor method for regulating money creation.

Reserve requirements oblige commercial banks to keep a minimum, predetermined percentage of their deposits in an account at the central bank. Countries with no reserve requirement include the United States, Great Britain, Australia, Canada, and New Zealand, which means no minimum reserve requirement is imposed on banks. The constraining factor on bank lending recognized today is largely the number of available borrowers willing to create loan contracts.

== Degree of control ==
While central banks can directly control the issuance of physical currency, the question of to what extent they can control broad monetary aggregates like M2 by also indirectly controlling the money creation of commercial banks is more controversial. According to the money multiplier theory, which is often cited in macroeconomics textbooks, the central bank controls the money multiplier because it can impose reserve requirements and consequently, via this mechanism, also governs the amount of money created by commercial banks. Most central banks in developed countries, however, have ceased to rely on this theory and have stopped shaping their monetary policy through required reserves.

Benjamin Friedman explains in his chapter on the money supply in The New Palgrave Dictionary of Economics that the money multiplier representation is a shorthand simplification of a more complex equilibrium of supply and demand in the markets for both reserves (outside money) and inside money. Friedman adds that the simplification will work well or badly "depending on the strength of the relevant interest elasticities and the extent of variation in interest rates and the many other factors involved". David Romer notes in his graduate textbook Advanced Macroeconomics that it is difficult for central banks to control broad monetary aggregates like M2.

Monetarist theory, which was prominent during the 1970s and 1980s, argued that the central bank should concentrate on controlling the money supply through its monetary operations. The strategy did not work well for the central banks like the US Federal Reserve that tried it, however, and it was abandoned after some years. Central banks then turned to steering interest rates to obtain their monetary policy goals rather than holding the quantity of base money fixed in order to steer money growth. Interest rates influence commercial bank issuance of credit indirectly, so the ceiling implied by the money multiplier does not impose a limit on money creation in practice. By setting interest rates, central-bank operations will affect, but not control, the money supply. (Note: "Another common misconception is that the central bank determines the quantity of loans and deposits in the economy by controlling the quantity of central bank money. ... Rather than controlling the quantity of reserves, central banks today typically implement monetary policy by setting the price of reserves — that is, interest rates." McLeay (2014))

== Credit theory of money ==
The fractional reserve theory of money creation, where the money supply is limited by the money multiplier, has been abandoned since the 2008 financial crisis. It has been observed that bank reserves are not a limiting factor because the central banks supply more reserves than necessary (excess reserves). Economists and bankers now understand that the amount of money in circulation is limited only by the demand for loans.

The credit theory of money, initiated by Joseph Schumpeter, asserts the central role of banks as creators and allocators of the money supply and distinguishes between "productive credit creation" (allowing non-inflationary economic growth even at full employment, in the presence of technological progress) and "unproductive credit creation" (resulting in inflation of either the consumer- or asset-price variety).

The model of bank lending stimulated through central-bank operations (such as "monetary easing") has been rejected by Neo-Keynesian and Post-Keynesian analysis as well as central banks. (Note: "In reality, neither are[bank] reserves a binding constraint on lending, nor does the central bank fix the amount of reserves that are available. ... Banks first decide how much to lend depending on the profitable lending opportunities available to them — which will, crucially, depend on the interest rate set by the [central bank]." McLeay et al. (2014)) The major argument offered by dissident analysis is that any bank balance-sheet expansion (e.g., through a new loan) that leaves the bank short of the required reserves may affect the return it can expect on the loan because of the extra cost the bank will undertake to return within the ratio limits–but this does not and "will never impede the bank's capacity to give the loan in the first place". Banks first lend and then cover their reserve ratios: The decision whether or not to lend is generally independent of their reserves with the central bank or their deposits from customers; banks are not lending out deposits or reserves, anyway. Banks lend on the basis of lending criteria, such as the status of the customer's business, the loan's prospects, and/or the overall economic situation.

== See also ==
- Commissary notes
- Commodity money
- Endogenous money
- Demurrage currency
- Fiscal policy
- Friedman's k-percent rule
- Functional finance
- Global debt
- History of banking
- Monetary economics
- Monetary reform
- Monetary sovereignty
- Monetary system
- Positive Money — a UK non-profit advocating for money creation to be done by the government for the public good
- Seigniorage
- The End of Alchemy — Mervyn King book depicting money creation as a financial form of alchemy
- The Age of Debt Bubbles — 2024 book on the money creation process
- Princes of the Yen — book by Richard Werner on the Japanese Lost Decades
