= June Boyce-Tillman =

British music academic

June Barbara Boyce-Tillman MBE (born 1943) is a prominent British academic specialising in music, spirituality and theology, particularly women's role in church music. She is Professor of Applied Music at the University of Winchester and was ordained as a deacon of the Church of England in 2006 and as a priest in 2007.

== Academic work ==
Boyce-Tillman read music at St Hugh's College, Oxford, before completing a Doctor of Philosophy (PhD) at the Institute of Education. Her doctorate on the development of children's musical creativity was widely published nationally and internationally. Much of her scholarship has become influential in music education research, especially her use of ideas of well-being, liminality, and ecology. Her work includes research on Hildegard of Bingen and many articles on interfaith dialogue. She is the founder of the Hildegard Network.

== Performances and compositions ==
Boyce-Tillman has performed one-person shows combining music and story-telling across the world and is a composer of religious music. Her compositions and recordings include The Healing of The Earth (1997) and Hildegard of Bingen — A Life Apart (1996). In March 2008, she conducted the Southern Sinfonia at the Anvil concert hall in Basingstoke, for the premier of her new piece Step Into The Picture. This was a collaboration between the University of Winchester, Southern Sinfonia and Hampshire County Council.

She was appointed Member of the Order of the British Empire (MBE) in the 2008 Birthday Honours.

== Selection of published works ==
- Unconventional Wisdom, 2007
- The Creative Spirit, 2000
- Constructing Musical Healing: The Wounds that Sing, 2000
- Singing the Mystery — Liturgical Pieces by Hildegard of Bingen, 1994
- In Praise of All-Encircling Love, 1992
- The Oxford Assembly Book, (Editor), 1990
