= Joy Carter =

British geologist and academic

Joy Carter CBE, DL, FGS
- Born: 26 December 1955 (age 70)
- Education: University of Durham (B.S.); University of Lancaster (Ph.D.)
- Occupations: Geologist; academic

Joy E. Carter, CBE, DL, FGS (née Randlesome; born 26 December 1955) is a British geologist and academic, specialising in geochemistry. From 2006 to 2021, she held the position of Vice-Chancellor of the University of Winchester. She previously taught at the University of Reading, University of Derby, and the University of Glamorgan; she served as a pro-vice-chancellor at Glamorgan. She has additionally served as the chair of GuildHE since 2013, an organisation representing the heads of British higher education institutions, and was chair of the Cathedrals Group from 2011, an association of British universities and university colleges with religious foundations.

== Early life and education ==
Carter was born on 26 December 1955. She studied at the University of Durham, graduating with a Bachelor of Science (BSc) degree in 1977, and at the University of Lancaster, graduating with a Doctor of Philosophy (PhD) degree in 1980. Her doctoral thesis was titled "The geochemistry of mercury in estuarine mixing and sedimentation".

== Honours ==
In March 2013, Carter was appointed a Deputy Lieutenant (DL) to the Lord Lieutenant of Hampshire. In the 2018 New Year Honours, she was appointed a Commander of the Order of the British Empire (CBE) "for services to higher education".

== Selected works ==
- Jickells, T. D.; Rae, J. E., eds. (1997). Biogeochemistry of intertidal sediments. Cambridge: Cambridge University Press. ISBN 978-0521483063.
- Parker, Andrew; Rae, Joy E., eds. (1998). Environmental interactions of clays. Berlin, Heidelberg: Springer. ISBN 978-3540587385.
- Carter, J. E.; Stewart, A. G. (1 July 2000). "Environmental geochemistry and health: an integrated future in medical and geochemical studies—the example of iodine". Journal of the Geological Society. 157 (4): 835–836. Bibcode:2000JGSoc.157..835C. doi:10.1144/jgs.157.4.835. S2CID 129058856.
