= Mark Johnson (announcer) =

- Born: 7 February 1966 (age 60); Skegness, Lincolnshire, United Kingdom
- Education: King Alfred's College, Winchester
- Known for: Horse racing announcer
- Partner: Katherine Heptonstall
- Parent(s): Derek and Joy Johnson

Mark Johnson (born 7 February 1966) is a British thoroughbred horse racing announcer in both the United States and United Kingdom.

== Early life ==
Born in Skegness, Lincolnshire to Derek Johnson, Johnson attended Skegness Grammar School, King Alfred's College in Winchester, Hampshire and London College of Printing in Elephant and Castle, London receiving a BA (Hons) in Television and Theatre Studies, and a postgraduate diploma in radio journalism.

== Career ==
His first race commentary was in 1986 at Tweseldown Racecourse in Fleet, Hampshire. In 1995, he called his first Classic, the St. Leger Stakes at Doncaster Racecourse in South Yorkshire, and as of May 2009, had announced eleven St. Legers, and five Epsom Derbies. He has also announced multiple Cheltenham Gold Cup and Grand National steeplechase races.

Following the unexpected death of announcer Luke Kruytbosch in an apparent heart attack, Johnson became the track announcer at Churchill Downs in Louisville, Kentucky in January 2009, calling his first Kentucky Derby later that year after being selected amongst five announcers who called different weeks in the 2008 Fall Meet. This made him the first announcer to have called The Epsom Derby and The Kentucky Derby. He also did paddock commentary with Jill Byrne at Churchill Downs. His tenure ended in the Fall Meet of 2013 in what Churchill described as an "amicable parting".

Johnson has covered fences 1/17 – 4/20 and fences 10/26 – Anchor Bridge crossing in the Grand National for ITV on terrestrial television from 2017. He's also covered the race for Racing UK (now Racing TV).

== Personal life ==
He married Alexandra Embiricos, in December 1997, the daughter of Nick Embiricos of West Sussex. They lived in Twickenham.
