= Paul Light (psychologist) =

Paul Henry Light (born 1947) is a British academic and psychologist. He was the first Vice-Chancellor of the University of Winchester.

== Early life ==
Light was brought up in Weymouth in Dorset and studied Psychology from 1966 until c 1974 at St John's College, Cambridge, where he obtained an MA and also a doctorate.

== Academic career ==
He held a professorship in Psychology at the University of Southampton, and a professorship in Education at the Open University, before becoming Pro-Vice-Chancellor (Academic) of Bournemouth University. He was appointed Principal of King Alfred's College, Winchester, in 2000. King Alfred’s College evolved into the University of Winchester in 2005 with Professor Light as its first Vice Chancellor. He retired from the University of Winchester in April 2006. Following this, he was a member of the Board of Governors of the University of Portsmouth.

Academic offices
New title	Vice-Chancellor of the University of Winchester; 2005–2006	Succeeded by Joy Carter
