= Lost Decades =

Period of economic stagnation in Japan

The Lost Decades are a lengthy period of economic stagnation in Japan precipitated by the asset price bubble's collapse beginning in 1990. The term Lost Decade (失われた10年, Ushinawareta Jūnen) originally referred to the 1990s, but the term expanded as economic troubles continued in the 2000s (Lost 20 Years, 失われた20年) and the 2010s (Lost 30 Years, 失われた30年).

From 1991 to 2003, the Japanese economy, as measured by GDP, grew only 1.14% annually, while the average real growth rate between 2000 and 2010 was about 1%, both well below other industrialized nations. Debt levels continued to rise due to the Great Recession, the 2011 Tōhoku earthquake and tsunami, and the COVID-19 recession. Broadly affecting the entire Japanese economy, over the period of 1995 to 2025, the country's nominal GDP fell from $5.55 trillion to $4.27 trillion, real wages fell around 11%, while the country experienced a stagnant or decreasing price level.

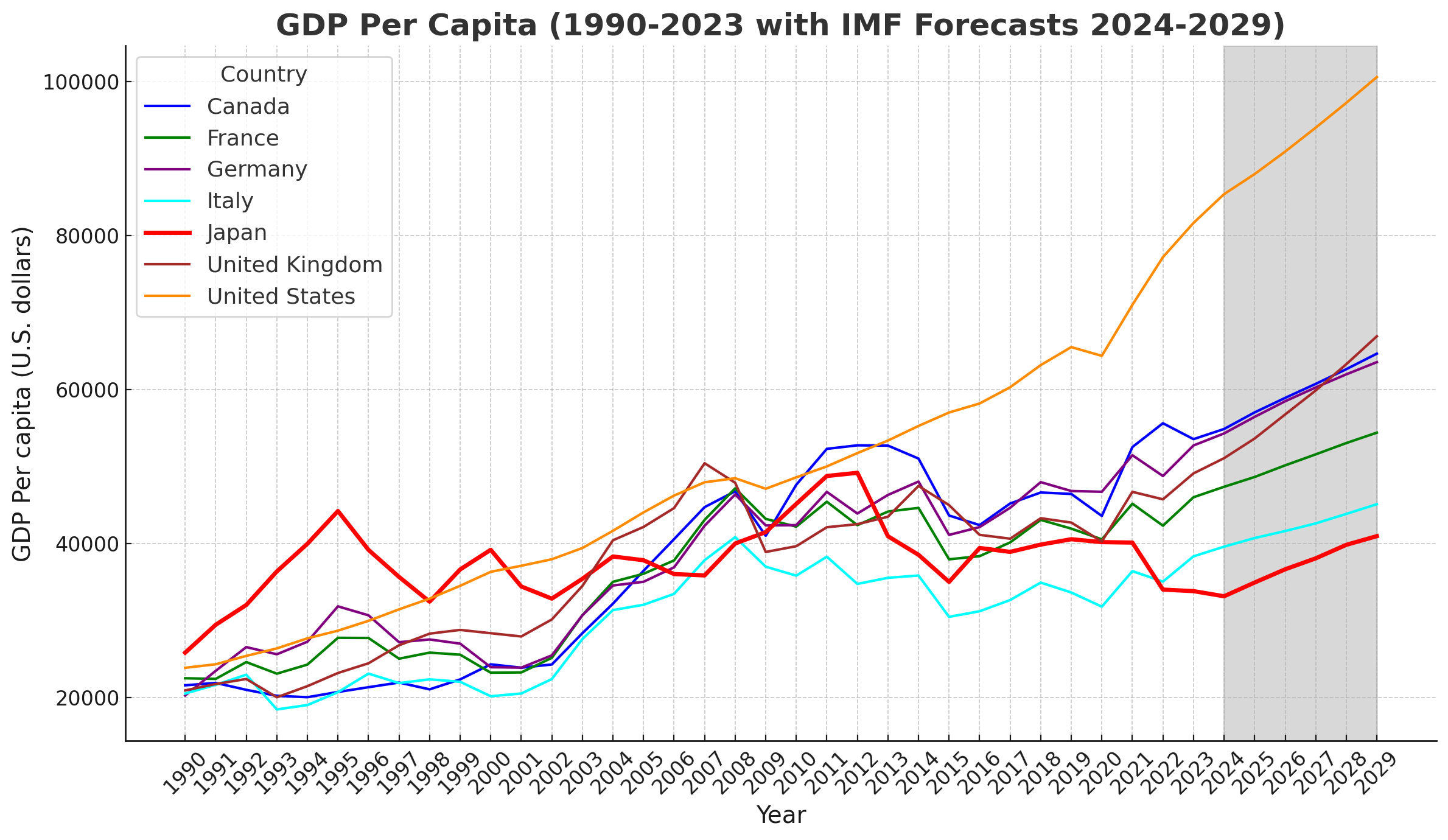
Japan's nominal GDP per capita has stagnated around $40,000 since the 1990s, while other economies have experienced significant growth.

Under deflation, the value of cash increases as time passes. In such a situation, Japanese companies began to cut wages, research and development, and other investments, opting to hold onto cash instead. This tendency, coinciding with the acceleration of the aging population, gradually diminished the competitiveness of the economy and the potential growth rate of the country. The Bank of Japan (BoJ) and the Japanese government have focused on halting the deflation and eventually achieving the 2% inflation target since the early 2000s. However, as deflation persisted, the traditional monetary policy of setting low interest rates to stimulate investment and consumption, which typically causes inflation, became ineffective. This ineffectiveness arose because a nominal rate of 0% effectively meant a positive real rate due to the increasing value of cash. This phenomenon is known as the zero lower bound.

In 2013, the BoJ implemented the Quantitative and Qualitative Monetary Easing Policy, and in 2016, it introduced a negative bank rate of −0.1%. This policy achieved mild inflation of around 0–1.0% in the late 2010s. Japan's economy emerged from deflation in the 2020s, which was also accompanied by wage growth. The global inflation surge from 2021 to 2023 finally helped Japan reach an inflation rate of above 2%. However, while other major economies focus on suppressing inflation by raising interest rates, Japan aims to firmly establish inflation by maintaining low rates. As a side effect, the Japanese yen has become extremely weak, hitting a 37.5-year low of 161 yen/USD in July 2024. The real effective exchange rate was at 68.36 in June 2024, the lowest level since statistics began in 1970, with the 2020 average set at 100. This devaluation of the currency caused Japan to lose its status as the world's third largest economy to Germany in nominal terms, which was approximately half the size of the country's economy a decade earlier.

While there is some debate on the extent and measurement of Japan's setbacks, the economic effect of the Lost Decades is well established, and Japanese policymakers continue to grapple with its consequences.

== Causes ==
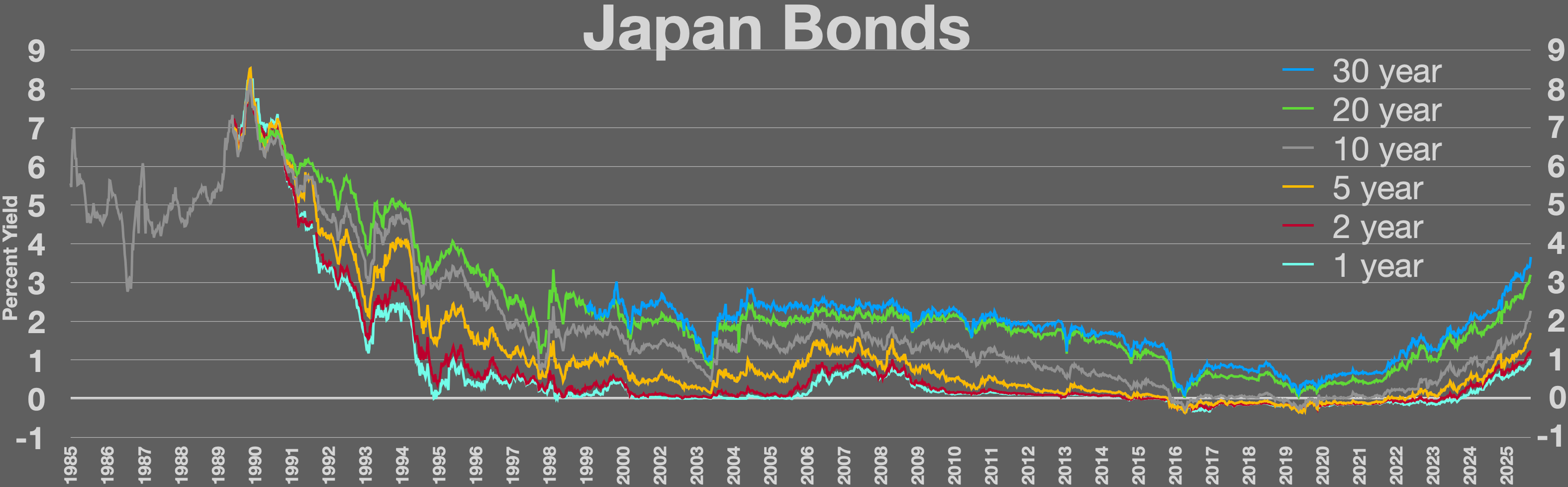
Japan bonds, inverted yield curve in 1990 30-year 20-year 10-year 5-year 2-year 1 year

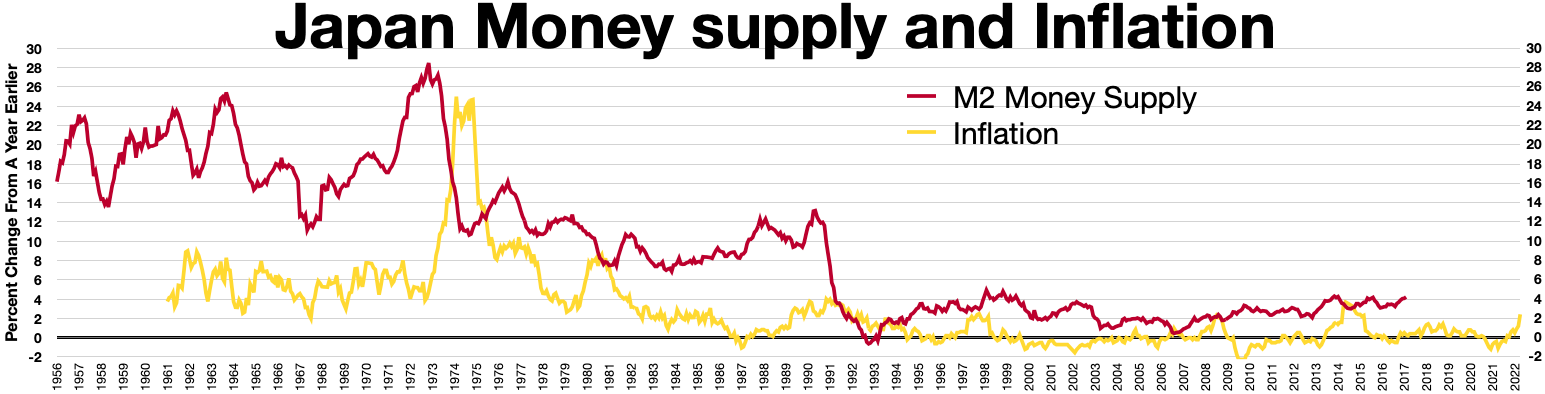
Japan money supply and inflation rate (year over year) M2 money supply Inflation

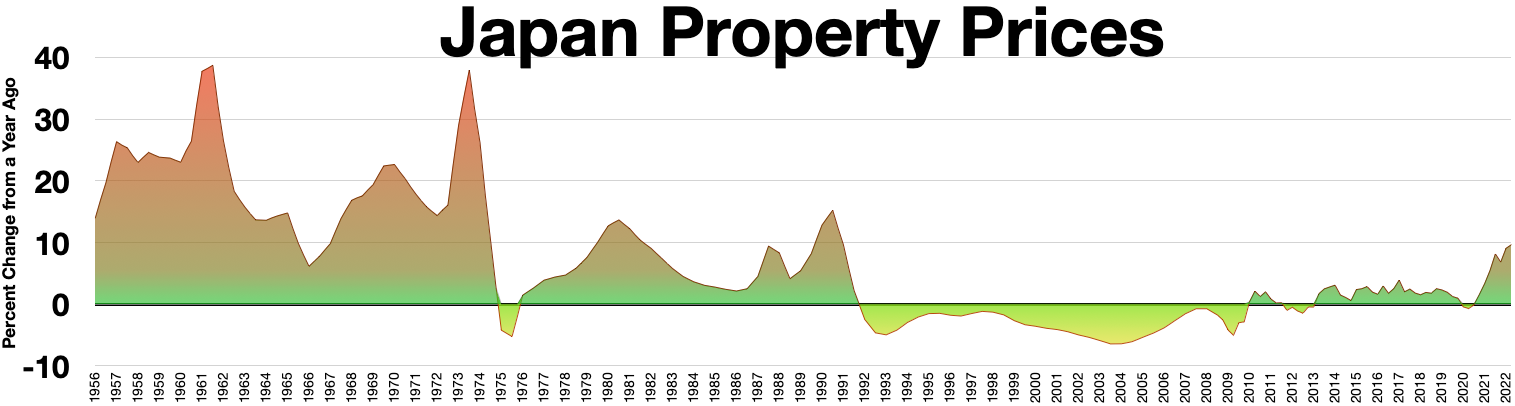
Rate of change in Japanese property prices, percentage (year over year)

Japan's economic miracle in the second half of the 20th century ended abruptly at the start of the 1990s. By the late 1980s, the Japanese economy experienced an asset price bubble caused by loan growth quotas dictated upon the banks by Japan's central bank, the Bank of Japan, through a policy mechanism known as the "window guidance". As economist Paul Krugman explained, "Japan's banks lent more, with less regard for quality of the borrower, than anyone else's. In doing so they helped inflate the bubble economy to grotesque proportions." Economist Richard Werner writes that external pressures such as the Plaza Accord and the policy of Ministry of Finance to reduce the official discount rate are insufficient to explain the actions taken by the Bank of Japan.

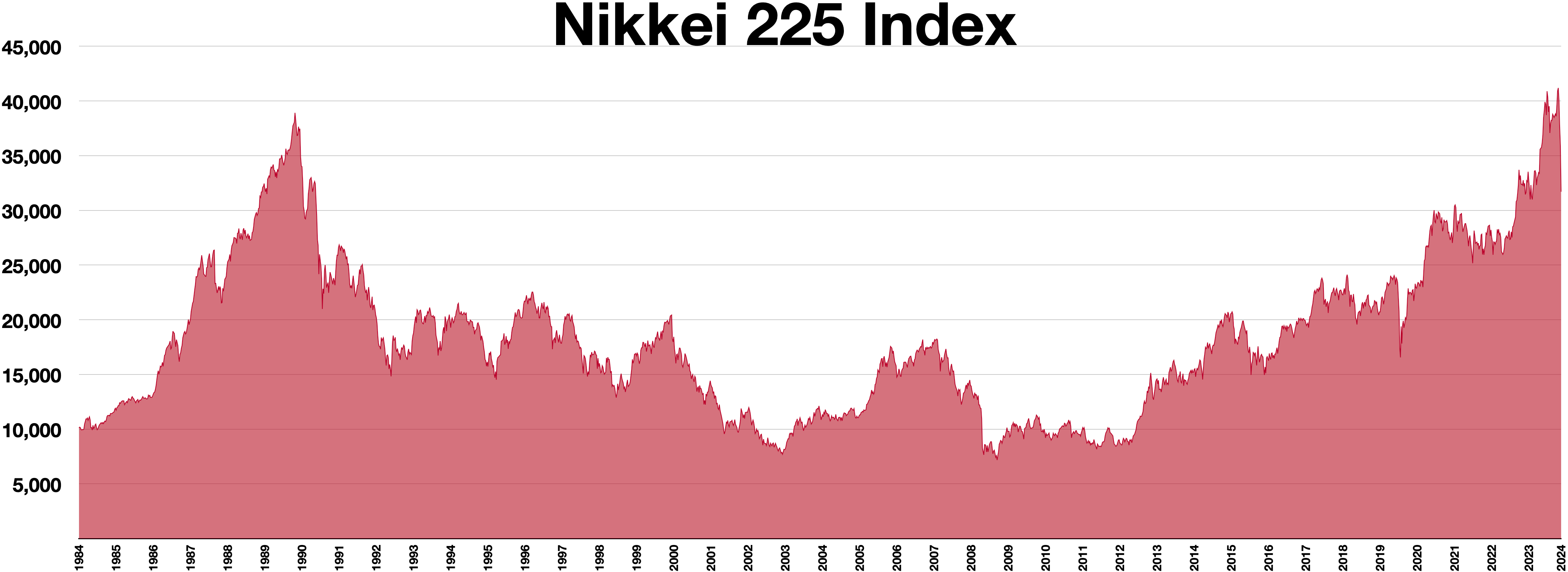
Nikkei 225 Index

Trying to deflate speculation and keep inflation in check, the Bank of Japan sharply raised inter-bank lending rates in late 1989. This sharp policy caused the bursting of the bubble, and the Japanese stock market crashed. Equity and asset prices fell, leaving overly-leveraged Japanese banks and insurance companies with books full of bad debt. As a result, bank credit growth stagnated. The financial institutions were bailed out through capital infusions from the Government of Japan, loans and cheap credit from the central bank, and the ability to postpone the recognition of losses, ultimately turning them into zombie banks. Yalman Onaran of Bloomberg News writing in Salon stated that the zombie banks were one of the reasons for the following long stagnation. Additionally, Michael Schuman of Time magazine wrote that these banks kept injecting new funds into unprofitable "zombie firms" to keep them afloat, arguing that they were too big to fail. However, most of these companies were too debt-ridden to do much more than survive on bail-out funds. Schuman believed that Japan's economy did not begin to recover until this practice had ended.

Eventually, many of these failing firms became unsustainable, and a wave of consolidation took place, resulting in four national banks in Japan. Many Japanese firms were burdened with heavy debts, and it became very difficult to obtain credit. Many borrowers turned to sarakin (loan sharks) for loans. As of 2012, the official interest rate was 0.1%; the interest rate has remained below 1% since 1994.

== Economic effects ==
Despite mild economic recovery in the 2000s, conspicuous consumption of the 1980s has not returned to the same pre-crash levels. Japanese firms such as Toyota, Sony, Panasonic, Sharp, and Toshiba, which had dominated their respective industries from the 1960s to the 1990s, had to fend off strong competition from rival firms based in other East Asian countries, particularly South Korea and China, since the 2000s. In 1989, of the world's top 50 companies by market capitalization, 32 were Japanese; by 2018, only 1 such company (Toyota) remains in the top 50. Many Japanese companies replaced a large part of their workforce with temporary workers, who had little job security and fewer benefits. As of 2009, these non-traditional employees made up more than a third of the labor force. For the wider Japanese workforce, wages have stagnated. From their peak in 1997, real wages fell around 13% by 2013, standing out even by international standards. Surveys by the Ministry of Health, Labour and Welfare showed that household income in 2010 had fallen to 1987 levels. According to Teikoku Databank, Japan's largest credit rating agency, the aggregate sales of all companies in Japan decreased by 3.9% in 2010 compared to 2000, or a decrease of 13,848.2 billion yen.

The wider economy of Japan is still recovering from the consequences of the 1991 crash and subsequent lost decades. It took 12 years for Japan's GDP to recover to the same levels as 1995. And as a greater sign of economic malaise, Japan also fell behind in output per capita; in 1995, Japan had a nominal GDP per capita of $44,210, the world's third highest behind Luxembourg and Switzerland, while by 2025, it had fallen to $34,713, the 36th in the world. In 1991, real output per capita in Japan was 14% higher than that of Australia, but in 2011 real output had dropped to 14% below Australia's levels. In the span of 30 years, Japan also experienced slower labor productivity growth than other countries. Whereas in 1990 it ranked sixth among G7 nations ahead of the United Kingdom, in 2021 labor productivity of Japan was the lowest in the G7 and ranked 29th of 38 OECD members. As of 2025; Japan's nominal GDP and GDP per capita remains smaller than its 1995 levels.

In response to chronic deflation and low growth, Japan has attempted economic stimulus and thereby run a fiscal deficit since 1991. These economic stimuli have had at best nebulous effects on the Japanese economy and have contributed to the huge debt burden on the Japanese government. Expressed as a percentage of GDP, at ~240% Japan had the highest level of debt of any nation on earth as of 2013. While Japan is a special case where the majority of public debt is held in the domestic market and by the Bank of Japan, the sheer size of the debt demands large service payments and is a worrying sign of the country's financial health.

More than 25 years after the initial market crash, Japan was still feeling the effects of Lost Decades. However, several Japanese policymakers have attempted reforms to address the malaise in the Japanese economy. After Shinzō Abe was elected as Japanese prime minister in December 2012, Abe introduced a reform program known as Abenomics which sought to address many of the issues raised by Japan's Lost Decades. His "three arrows" of reform intend to address Japan's chronically low inflation, decreasing worker productivity relative to other developed nations, and demographic issues raised by an aging population. Initially, investor response to the announced reform was strong, and the Nikkei 225 rallied to 20,000 in May 2015 from a low of around 9,000 in 2008. The Bank of Japan has set a 2% target for consumer-price inflation, although initial successes has been hampered by a sales tax increase enacted to balance the government budget. However, the effect on wages and consumer sentiment was more muted. A Kyodo News poll in January 2014 found that 73% of Japanese respondents had not personally noticed the effects of Abenomics, only 28 percent expected to see a pay raise, and nearly 70% were considering cutting back spending following the increase in the consumption tax.

In early 2020, as Japan began to suffer from the COVID-19 pandemic, Jun Saito of the Japan Center for Economic Research stated that the pandemic's aftermath delivered the "final blow" to Japan's long-fledgling economy, which had resumed slow growth in 2018. In February 2024, Nikkei 225 reached 39,098.68, the highest point in the Lost Decades and higher than the bubble era. While Jiji Press stated that Japan has escaped from the Lost Decades, Kasuo Mannma (門間一夫), executive economist of Mizuho Information & Research Institute, opposed the "escaped" claim by citing GDP growth rates and consumer spending and indicated that the Nikkei point is benefited from Japanese companies' corporate reform instead of economic growth in Japan. Nippon.com also cites the loss of Tokyo market and Japan's slow growing nominal GDP, and issues on demographics and national debt.

== Interpretation ==
Economist Paul Krugman has argued that Japan's lost decades are an example of a liquidity trap (a situation in which monetary policy is unable to lower nominal interest rates because it is already close to zero). He explained how truly massive the asset bubble was in Japan by 1990, with a tripling of land and stock market prices during the prosperous 1980s. Japan's high personal savings rates, driven in part by the demographics of an aging population, enabled Japanese firms to rely heavily on traditional bank loans from supporting banking networks, as opposed to issuing stock or bonds via the capital markets to acquire funds. The cozy relationship of corporations to banks and the implicit guarantee of a taxpayer bailout of bank deposits created a significant moral hazard problem, leading to an atmosphere of crony capitalism and reduced lending standards. In so doing they helped inflate the bubble economy to grotesque proportions. The Bank of Japan began increasing interest rates in 1990 due in part to concerns over the bubble and in 1991 land and stock prices began a steep decline, within a few years reaching 60% below their peak.

Economist Richard Koo wrote that Japan's "Great Recession" that began in 1990 was a "balance sheet recession". It was triggered by a collapse in land and stock prices, which caused Japanese firms to become insolvent. Despite zero interest rates and expansion of the money supply to encourage borrowing, Japanese corporations in aggregate opted to pay down their debts from their own business earnings rather than borrow to invest as firms typically do. Corporate investment, a key demand component of GDP, fell enormously (22% of GDP) between 1990 and its peak decline in 2003. Japanese firms overall became net savers after 1998, as opposed to borrowers. Koo argues that it was massive fiscal stimulus (borrowing and spending by the government) that offset this decline and enabled Japan to maintain its level of GDP. In his view, this avoided a U.S. type Great Depression, in which U.S. GDP fell by 46%. He argued that monetary policy was ineffective because there was limited demand for funds while firms paid down their liabilities. In a balance sheet recession, GDP declines by the amount of debt repayment and un-borrowed individual savings, leaving government stimulus spending as the primary remedy.

Economist Scott Sumner has argued that Japan's monetary policy was too tight during the Lost Decades and thus prolonged the pain felt by the Japanese economy.

Economists Fumio Hayashi and Edward Prescott argue that the anemic performance of the Japanese economy since the early 1990s is mainly due to the low growth rate of aggregate productivity. Their hypothesis stands in direct contrast to popular explanations that are based in terms of an extended credit crunch that emerged in the aftermath of a bursting asset "bubble." They are led to explore the implications of their hypothesis on the basis of evidence that suggests that despite the ongoing difficulties in the Japanese banking sector, desired capital expenditure was for the most part fully financed. They suggest that Japan's sluggish investment activity is likely to be better understood in terms of low levels of desired capital expenditure and not in terms of credit constraints that prohibit firms from financing projects with positive net present value (NPV). Monetary or fiscal policies might increase consumption in the short run, but unless productivity growth increases, there is a legitimate fear that such a policy may simply transform Japan from a low-growth/low-inflation economy to a low-growth/high-inflation economy.

In her analysis of Japan's gradual path to economic success and then quick reversal, Jennifer Amyx wrote that Japanese experts were not unaware of the possible causes of Japan's economic decline. Rather, to return Japan's economy back to the path to economic prosperity, policymakers would have had to adopt policies that would first cause short-term harm to the Japanese people and government, like for example bank bailouts. Under this analysis, says Ian Lustick, Japan was stuck on a "local maximum," which it arrived at through gradual increases in its fitness level, set by the economic landscape of the 1970s and 80s. Without an accompanying change in institutional flexibility, Japan was unable to adapt to changing conditions and even though experts may have known which changes needed to be made, they would have been virtually powerless to enact those changes without instituting unpopular policies which would have been harmful in the short-term. Lustick's analysis is rooted in the application of evolutionary theory and natural selection to understanding institutional rigidity in the social sciences.

== Legacy ==
After the Great Recession of 2007–2009, many Western governments and commentators have referenced the Lost Decades as a distinct economic possibility for stagnating developed nations. On 9 February 2009, in warning of the dire consequences facing the US economy after its housing bubble, U.S. President Barack Obama cited the "lost decades" as a prospect the American economy faced. And in 2010, Federal Reserve Bank of St. Louis President James Bullard warned that the United States was in danger of becoming "enmeshed in a Japanese-style deflationary outcome within the next several years."

== See also ==
- 1997 Asian financial crisis
- 1991 Indian economic crisis
- Economic history of Japan
- Economic stagnation
- Employment Ice Age
- Great Recession
- Japanese economic miracle
- Princes of the Yen: book by Richard Werner about the macroeconomics behind the Lost Decade
- Zero interest rate policy
- List of stock market crashes and bear markets
