= Mark Diacono =

British food writer

Mark Diacono is a food writer, grower, photographer and cook, who has published 13 books. In 2015, he won the André Simon Food Book of the Year 2014 for his book A Year at Otter Farm, and in 2011 he was awarded Food Book of the Year for A Taste of the Unexpected by the Guild of Food Writers.

He established a smallholding, Otter Farm, near Honiton in East Devon, England. In 2016 Otter Farm was featured on Grand Designs when Mark, wife Candida and daughter Nell contracted the build of the farmhouse and adjoining cookery school in steel frame and cob.

He has a long association with River Cottage, having appeared in the TV series, run courses, written books and led the garden team there.

Mark is an Honorary Fellow of Liverpool University, was awarded an Honorary Degree by University of Winchester, and has a MSc in Environmental Management and Planning (Distinction) from Oxford Brookes University.

== Books ==
- Veg Patch: River Cottage Handbook No.4 (2009)
- A Taste of the Unexpected (2010)
- Fruit: River Cottage Handbook No. 9 (2011)
- The Speedy Vegetable Garden (2013)
- Chicken & Eggs: River Cottage Handbook No.11 (2013)
- A Year at Otter Farm (2014)
- The New Kitchen Garden (2015)
- Sour (2019)
- Ferment (2021)
- Herb (2021)
- Spice (2022)
- Vegetables (2024)

Photography only

- Herbs: River Cottage Handbook No. 10 (2012)
- My Cool Allotment: An Inspirational Guide to Stylish Allotments and Community Gardens (2013)

== Awards ==
- James Beard Foundation Shortlist Single Subject, for SOUR, 2020
- André Simon Food Book of the Year 2014
- Guild of Food Writers: Food Book of the Year (2011)
- Garden Media Guild: Book Photographer of the Year (2009 and 2013)
- Garden Media Guild: Journalist of the Year (2011)
