= Aes rude =

Nugget of bronze used as ancient currency

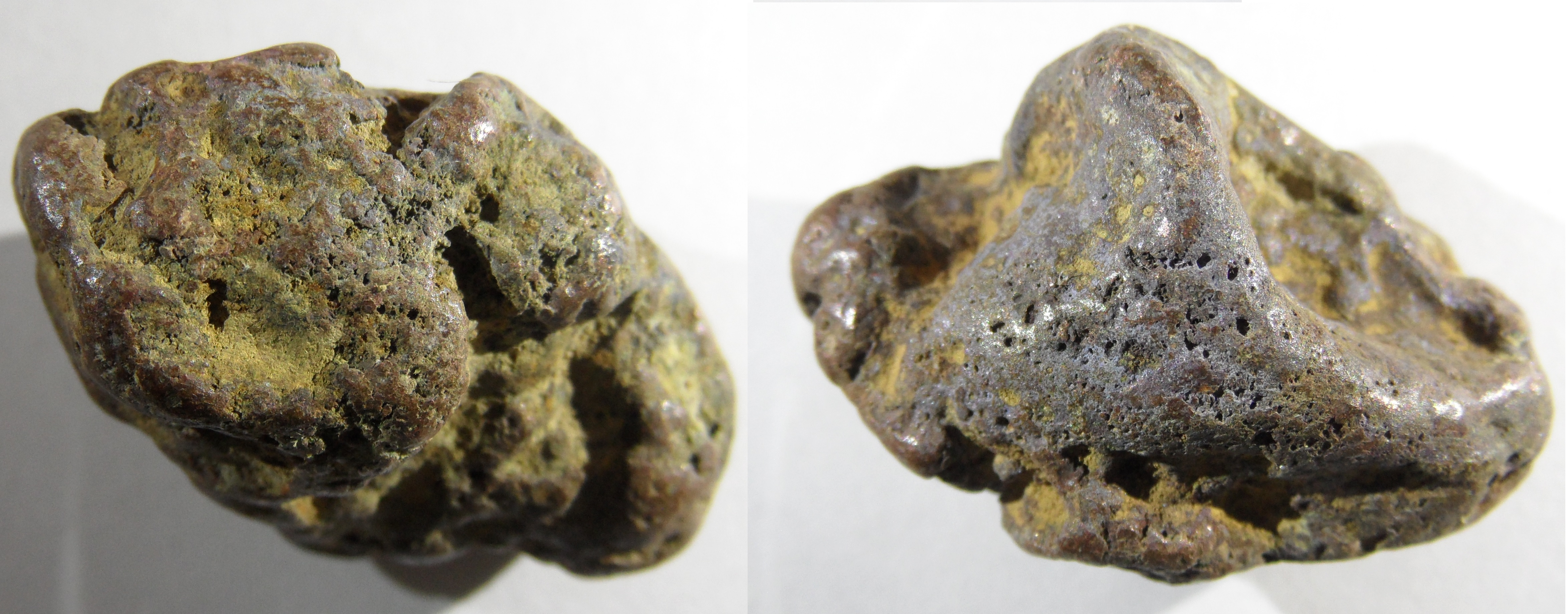
Bronze aes rude from 5th-4th century BC, Italy

Aes rude (Latin; lit. 'rough bronze') was a nugget of bronze used as a sort of proto-currency in ancient Italy prior to the use of minted coins made from precious metals.

The Italian economy of the time (late middle first millennium BC) was based on a bronze standard (unlike the silver standards in use in contemporary Greece, the Aeginetan standard and its competitor the Attic standard). Consequently, crudely worked lumps of bronze were used as both primitive ingots and as primitive coins, facilitating trade across the peninsula and paving the way for the first true Roman ingots, the aes signatum, which, in turn, was the precursor of the first Roman true coinage, the aes grave.

The earliest surviving piece of aes rude dates from the early 8th century BC and as late as the late 4th century BC, and was cast in central Italy. It is, simply, bronze, shaped vaguely like a lumpy ingot. Only later on did it become usual to mark these lumps and, eventually, make them into a standard shape (the round, thin disk-shape still in use today).

== See also ==
- Roman Republican coinage

== Sources ==
- https://web.archive.org/web/20051228143453/http://dougsmith.ancients.info/feac56cas.html
- Lloyd, J. (trans.), Orrieux, C. & Schmitt Pantel, P., A History of Ancient Greece, Oxford, 1999, Blackwell Publishers, Ltd.
- Haeberlin E.: Aes Grave, Das Schwergeld Roms und Mittelitaliens einschließlich der ihm vorausgehenden Rohbronzewährung, Halle 1910
- Sydenham, Edward A.: Aes Grave A Study of the Cast Coinages of Rome and Central Italy. London, Spink, 1926
- Head Barclay V. Historia Nummorum, a Manual of Greek Numismatic, London, 1911
- Gaius Plinius Secundus (Pliny the Elder): Naturalis Historia, XXXIII, XIII, 43 (antea rudi usos Romae Timaeus tradit).
- Italo Vecchi. Italian Cast Coinage. A descriptive catalogue of the cast coinage of Rome and Italy. London Ancient Coins, London 2013. Hard bound in quarto format, 84 pages, 92 plates. ISBN 978-0-9575784-0-1
