= Richard Werner =

German economist

Richard Andreas Werner is a German banking and development economist who is presently a university professor at University of Winchester. In 2001 he published his book Princes of the Yen about chartalism and functional finance policies in Japan.

== Early life ==
Werner was born in Germany and studied in the United Kingdom. In 1989, he earned a BSc in economics at the London School of Economics (LSE). During his postgraduate studies at Oxford University he spent over a year in Japan, studying at the University of Tokyo and working at the Nomura Research Institute. His DPhil in economics was conferred by the University of Oxford. In 1991, he became European Commission-sponsored Marie Curie Fellow at the Institute for Economics and Statistics at Oxford. His 1991 discussion paper at the institute warned about the imminent 'collapse' of the Japanese banking system and the threat of the "greatest recession since the Great Depression". In Tokyo, he also became the first Shimomura Fellow at the Research Institute for Capital Formation at the Development Bank of Japan. He was a visiting researcher at the Institute for Monetary and Economic Studies at the Bank of Japan; and he was a visiting scholar at the Institute for Monetary and Fiscal Studies at the Ministry of Finance.

== Career ==
Werner was chief economist of Jardine Fleming from 1994 to 1998 and published several articles on the Japanese credit cycle and monetary policy, many of which are in Japanese. He joined the faculty of Sophia University in Tokyo (1997-2004) as a tenured assistant professor. Werner was senior managing director and senior portfolio manager at Bear Stearns Asset Management. He worked at the University of Southampton (2004-2018), mainly as Chair and Professor in International Banking. He is the founding director of the university's Centre for Banking, Finance and Sustainable Development and organiser of the European Conference on Banking and the Economy (ECOBATE), first held on 29 September 2011 in Winchester Guildhall, with Lord Adair Turner, FSA Chairman, as keynote speaker. From 2011 to 2019, he was a member of the ECB Shadow Council.

Werner has developed a theory of money creation called the Quantity Theory of Credit, which is in line with the credit theory of money supported by Joseph Schumpeter. He has argued, since 1992, that the banking sector needs to be reflected appropriately in macroeconomic models since it is the main creator and allocator of the money supply, through the process of credit creation by individual banks.

Werner's book Princes of the Yen, about the modern economic development of Japan, including the bubble of the 1990s and subsequent bust. The book covers the monetary policy of the Bank of Japan specifically and central bank informal guidance of bank credit in general.

Werner proposed a policy he called "quantitative easing" in Japan in 1994 and 1995. At the time working as chief economist of Jardine Fleming Securities (Asia) Ltd. in Tokyo, he used this expression during presentations to institutional investors in Tokyo. It is also, among others, in the title of an article he published on September 2, 1995, in the Nihon Keizai Shinbun (Nikkei). According to Werner, he used this phrase in order to propose a new form of monetary stimulation policy by the central bank that relied neither on interest rate reductions (which Werner claimed in his Nikkei article would be ineffective) nor on the conventional monetarist policy prescription of expanding the money supply (e.g. through "printing money", expanding high-powered money, expanding bank reserves or boosting deposit aggregates such as M2 – all of which Werner also claimed would be ineffective). Instead, Werner argued, it was necessary and sufficient for an economic recovery to boost "credit creation", through a number of measures. He also suggested direct purchases of non-performing assets from the banks by the central bank; direct lending to companies and the government by the central bank; purchases of commercial paper, other debt, and equity instruments from companies by the central bank; and stopping the issuance of government bonds to fund the public sector borrowing requirement, instead having the government borrow directly from banks through a standard loan contract.

In 2018, Werner joined De Montfort University as Professor of Banking and Finance. In 2019, Werner took out a discrimination case against his employer, Southampton University, claiming he was discriminated against and ‘victimised’ in a ‘harassment and bullying’ campaign for being German and Christian, during his 14 years' career at the university. The £2.5m default judgment was one of the largest awards ever made by a British tribunal and was so high because the university failed to defend itself. In July 2019, after a successful appeal by the University, the judgement was set aside and the case was set to proceed in the usual fashion. Werner was then, in August 2020, granted permission to appeal the decision in the Employment Appeal Tribunal. In the meantime Werner brought a discrimination claim against the University of Cambridge after they withdrew a conditional offer of employment in 2018. In 2022, Werner joined the University of Winchester as a Professor of Banking and Economics.

== See also ==
- Money creation
- List of economics journals
