= Princes of the Yen =

2003 book by Richard Werner

The Princes of the Yen: Japan's Central Bankers and the Transformation of the Economy
- Book cover (2003 ed.)
- Author: Richard Werner
- Language: Japanese; English; German
- Subject: Bank of Japan; Japanese economy
- Publisher: Routledge; Soshisha (in Japanese)
- Publication date: 25 April 2003
- Publication place: Japan; England
- Pages: 362
- ISBN: 978-0765610492

The Princes of the Yen: Japan's Central Bankers and the Transformation of the Economy (Japanese: 円の支配者) is a book by Richard Werner, a German monetary and development economist, published in 2003, about the macroeconomic policies widely associated with the Japanese economic miracle.

== History ==
Werner spent much of the 1990s and early 2000s in Japan, where he was a visiting researcher at the Bank of Japan and the Ministry of Finance and lecturing professor at Sophia University. In 2001, Werner published Princes of the Yen published in Japanese by Soshisha, Tokyo. In 2003, the English translation was published by the academic publisher M.E. Sharpe in Armonk, New York/Routledge. In 2016, the English translation, including the "long lost last chapter", was published by Quantum Publishers in Winchester/London.

== Contents ==
The book is an investigation of the macroeconomic driving forces behind the so-called Lost Decade, when the Japanese economy performed very poorly despite having witnessed many decades of hyper-growth. The book aimed to reveal the backroom dealings and secret plannings of the central bankers of Japan and the world in general. The author argues that Japan's elite policymakers ("princes") deliberately engineered and later burst the 1980s asset bubble to dismantle the country's wartime-style controlled economy. Central to this system was the Bank of Japan's "window guidance," which gave it real control over bank lending and, therefore, economic activity, despite widespread belief that the Ministry of Finance controlled monetary policy through interest rates. The argument rests on the idea that credit supply, not interest rates, ultimately drives the economy because imperfections in credit markets make lending supply-determined.

== Adaptations ==
The book was the basis for a documentary of the same name written and directed by Michael Oswald and released by Spider's Web Films.

== See also ==
- Bank of Japan
- Money creation
