= Commissary notes =

Financial certificates issued during the American Revolution

Commissary notes were financial certificates issued by the departments of the quartermaster and commissary-general on behalf of the Continental Army during the American Revolution. Due to the rapid depreciation of the Continental currency, the Continental Congress authorized soldiers to provide commissary notes as compensation for impressed supplies. However, the widespread use of these certificates further contributed to the trend of currency devaluation. Although distinct from the paper currency issued by the Continental Congress, commissary notes were accepted during state tax collections. Consequently, a large portion of the nearly worthless Continental notes remained in circulation despite Congressional attempts to improve credit through a reduction in the money supply.

== Origins ==
Given the revolutionary army’s lack of supplies when compared to the British, the Continental Congress recognized the need to impress certain goods and, in late 1776, allowed General George Washington to seize necessary supplies. Although the federal government did not initially endorse the states’ use of impressments, it later gave state governments great liberties to demand goods and services from local populations. The departments of the quartermaster and commissary-general, who were in charge of executing the impressments, experimented with multiple forms of payment. Congress originally authorized the army to fund impressments either with in-kind payments or with the paper Continental currency. However, the high levels of depreciation within the first few years of the war caused Congress to attempt to reimburse impressed goods with a new kind of promissory certificate that carried no interest rates. These so-called commissary notes began as hand-written documents but, as they became more popular, they were eventually mass-printed.

== Widespread Use ==
As the war continued, commissary notes were issued at both the Continental and state levels, especially as necessary supplies became scarce. In 1778, the government of Virginia issued warnings against people who bought specific goods, such as wheat, for the specific purpose of resale and authorized additional impressments, a trend soon followed in Maryland, Pennsylvania and New York. As the war escalated, the states further resorted to the use of impressments, with Virginia appointing local commissioners to conduct impressments on the county level. Moreover, later campaigns, including Yorktown, were largely funded with commissary notes rather than with other types of bills. Nevertheless, not all necessary goods were impressed since people who gave desired goods, such as beef, rum or clothing, to the troops received more favorable payments for their donations.

== Implications ==
Although scholars have not reached a consensus as to whether commissary notes were circulated as money, these notes undoubtedly were used for certain financial transactions. Indeed, Congress had to accept these certificates as legal payments when the states collected taxes. Although comprehensive state-by-state data on the distribution of commissary notes are not available, the overall nominal value of these notes eventually equaled the total value of Continental currency in circulation. As a result, these notes both increased the rate of deflation and, since they were often given to the state as taxes, much of the nearly worthless Continental currency remained uncollected. Despite the fact that Congress had stopped issuing Continental bills in 1779, the use of commissary notes thwarted attempts to combat inflation through a reduction in the money supply. High levels of depreciation continued throughout the war even as Congress attempted to consolidate the money supply under a new system in which older financial instruments, including bills, certificates and even lottery tickets, were bundled together and marked with new denominations that were set at fractions of their original total face values.

== Evolution and demise ==
As they did not pay any interest, the first commissary notes became essentially worthless and were largely removed from circulation by the states. Nevertheless, in 1780, quartermaster general Timothy Pickering approved a new wave of commissary notes that carried six percent interest rates under the terms that states provide a portion of the supplies purchased with the notes to the army. However, many states failed to comply and commissary notes once again contributed to currency depreciation, with the Continental Congress issuing a letter to the state governments in 1781 stating that “[commissary notes] continue to obstruct every plan which hath been devised for restoring public credit and supporting the war.”

After the war, commissary notes were included with other debts to be paid by the American government, but many of these notes were eventually redeemed by the states. In Massachusetts, for instance, the terms of a loan act passed in 1781 stipulated that commissary notes could be redeemed for up to one half of their face value. Overall, the high levels of depreciation during the war, in part caused by the glut of commissary notes, illustrated the dangers of allowing individual states to issue their own currencies and financial instruments, and prompted the authors of the United States Constitution to give the sole responsibility of issuing coinage and currency to the central government.

== See also ==
- Economic history of the United States
- History of the United States dollar
- Monetary policy
- Money creation
