= Inside money and outside money =

Money issued by private intermediaries

In monetary economics, inside money is money issued by private intermediaries (i.e., commercial banks) in the form of debt (credit). This money is typically in the form of demand deposits or other deposits and hence is part of the money supply. The money, which is an asset of the depositor but coincides with a liability of the bank, is inside money. Outside money is money that is not a liability for anyone "inside" the economy. It is held in an economy in net positive amounts. Examples are money that is backed by gold, and assets denominated in foreign currency or otherwise backed up by foreign debt, like foreign cash, stocks, or bonds. Typically, the private economy is considered as the "inside", so government-issued money is also "outside money".

Inside money is thus a liability (equivalently a negative asset) to the issuer, so the net amount of assets associated with inside money in an economy is zero. Most money circulating in a modern economy is inside money.

== See also ==
- Mutual credit
