= Aes signatum =

Ancient Roman currency

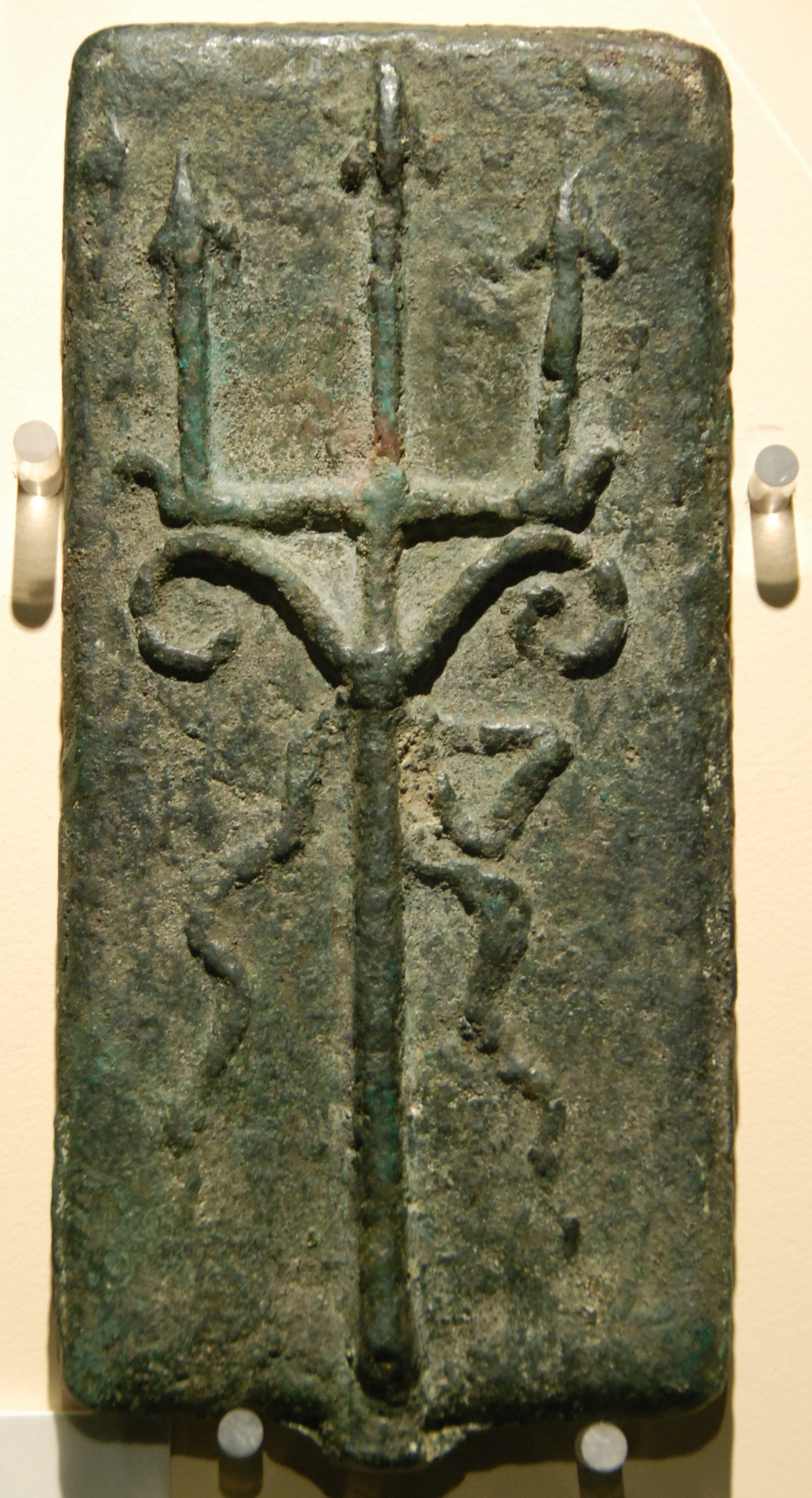
Aes signatum, Roman Republic after 450 BC; bronze; mm. 185,00x90,00; gr. 1616,62; Vatican Library, Rome

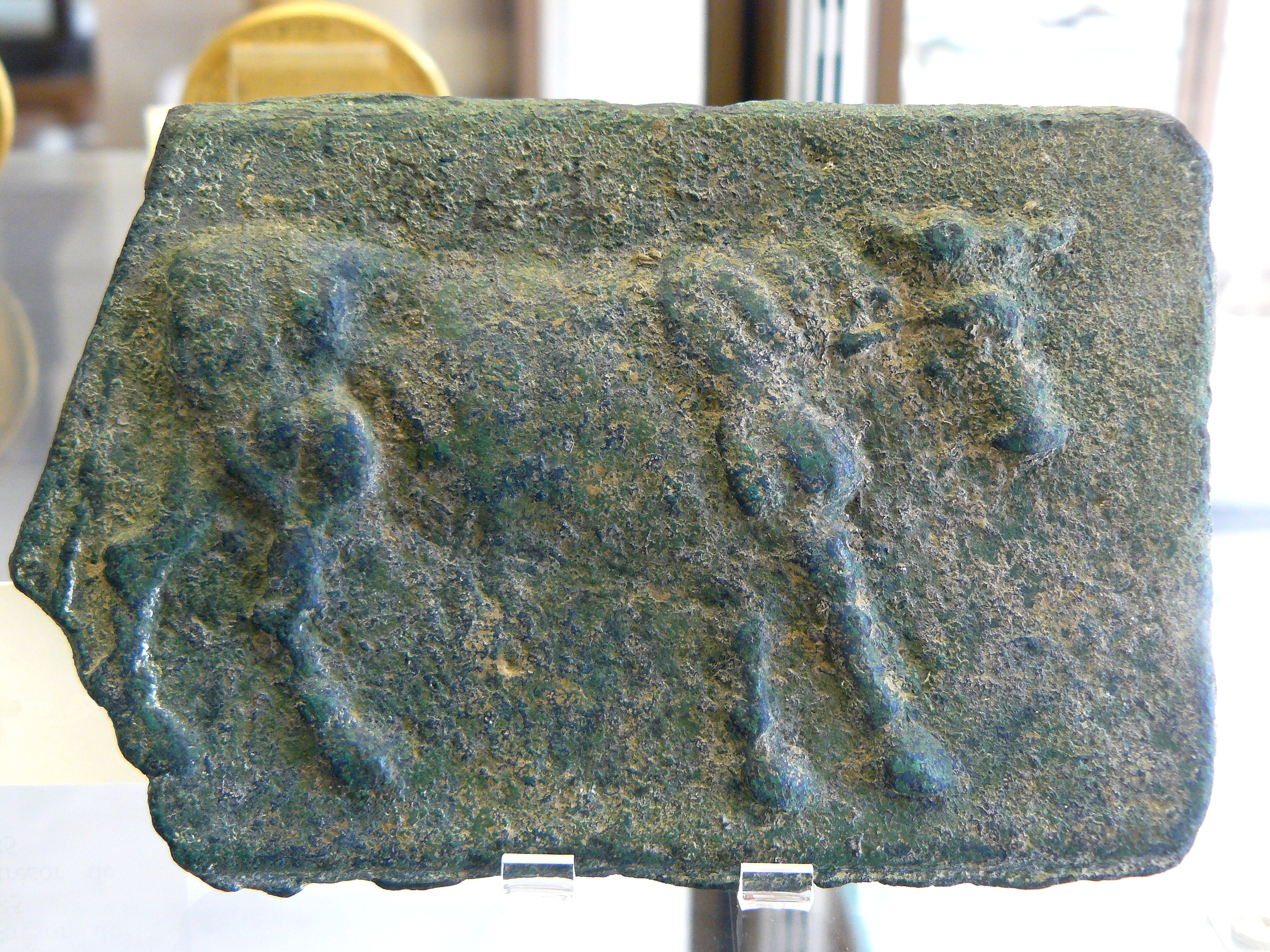
Aes signatum, fourth century BC (Cabinet des curiosités de la Bibliothèque sainte Geneviève - Cabinet des médailles, Paris)

Aes signatum (Latin; lit. 'stamped bronze') consisted of cast ingots of bronze of measured quality and weight, embossed with a government stamp, used as currency in Rome and central Italy starting in the 5th century BC before the introduction of aes grave in the mid 3rd century BC. When exactly they were first made is uncertain. Popular tradition ascribes them to Servius Tullius, but due to the high quality of art found on even the earliest specimens, this seems very unlikely. A date in the midst of the 5th century BC is generally agreed on. Designs featured are that of a bull, an eagle, and other religious symbols.

The earliest aes signatum was not cast in Rome proper, but in central Italy, Etruria, Umbria, and Reggio Emilia. It bore the image of a branch with side branches radiating from it, and was called ramo secco (lit. 'dry branch'). The bars did not adhere to a set weight standard, varying from about 600 to 2500 grams when complete. They were usually broken into subdivisions, and few complete specimens survive today. The surviving ramo secco bars are usually quarter, half or three quarter bars, or minor smaller pieces which could be classified as rough bronze. The same fragmentation into smaller change applies to later aes signatum issued by the city of Rome, which did correspond to the Roman heavy standard for the as. They weighed approximately 5 asses when whole. They could technically be termed a quincussis, although they are not marked with any value.

The Roman aes signatum conforms more strictly to size and weight standards because they are an official issue, where the ramo secco bars were more of a recognizable item of barter exchange that would be weighed, rather than taken at a face value. Ramo secco bars were not issued by governing bodies, and could have been made at any foundry facility.
