= Cathedrals Group =

Association of universities in the UK

The Cathedrals Group of Universities, commonly known as the Cathedrals Group, is an association of universities in the United Kingdom. All the member institutions were founded as teacher training colleges by either the Church of England, Roman Catholic Church or Methodist Church.

== History ==
In response to the decline in the number of Church of England teacher training colleges in the 1970s and 1980s, dropping from 27 in 1973 to 12 in 1985, the Council of Church and Associated Colleges of Higher Education was formed in 1988 as an umbrella group for these colleges, and registered as a charity in 1989. This became the Council of Church Colleges in 2000, and then the Council of Church Colleges and Universities in 2002, before being re-launched as the inter-denominational Cathedrals Group in 2009.

In 2019, the Church Times noted the differences between the newer Church of England-associated universities in the Cathedrals Group and the older institutions with structural links to the church (Oxford, Cambridge, Durham and King's College London). This concluded that the accountability of the church-linked colleges at Oxford, Cambridge and Durham to the Charity Commission meant that they had to demonstrate the religious part of their charitable work to the commission, while the Office for Students (which acts as the charity regulator for universities) has less interest in this side of the religious work of the newer universities. Coupled with market conditions, with fewer young people interested in religion, this meant that the religious affiliation of the Cathedrals Group institutions was downplayed. Research in 2019 by the Theos thinktank and Coventry University found that Cathedrals Group universities had fewer religious student societies than other types of university, partly explained by the smaller size of the Cathedrals Group universities, and less diversity in their religious societies with 29% being non-Christian compared to 48% nationally.

In 2024, five of the members of the group ranked in the top ten universities in Britain for student satisfaction in the National Student Survey (including then-member University of Wales Trinity St David).

== Members ==
As of January 2026, there are 14 member institutions:

- Birmingham Newman University (Roman Catholic)
- Canterbury Christ Church University (Church of England)
- University of Chester (Church of England)
- University of Chichester (Church of England)
- University of Cumbria (Church of England)
- University of Gloucestershire (Church of England)
- Leeds Trinity University (Roman Catholic)
- Lincoln Bishop University (Church of England)
- Liverpool Hope University (Church of England and Roman Catholic)
- Plymouth Marjon University (Church of England)
- University of Roehampton (four colleges: one Church of England, one Roman Catholic, one Methodist and one secular)
- St Mary's University, Twickenham (Roman Catholic)
- University of Winchester (Church of England)
- York St John University (Church of England)

Ten of the institutions and Whitelands College, Roehampton are members of the Colleges and Universities of the Anglican Communion. Four of the institutions are Roman Catholic institutes of higher study (including one, Liverpool Hope, that is also an Anglican university) and Digby Stuart College, Roehampton is a college of the Roman Catholic Society of the Sacred Heart. There are only two Methodist colleges of higher education in Britain: Southlands College, Roehampton and Wesley House, Cambridge.

=== Former members ===
- Heythrop College, University of London – began as a Jesuit seminary and closed in 2019
- University of Wales Trinity St David – formed by the merger of University of Wales Lampeter (founded as a church theological college) and Trinity University College (founded as a church teacher training college)
