= Deficit spending =

Spending in excess of revenue

Within the budgetary process, deficit spending is the amount by which spending exceeds revenue over a particular period of time, also called simply deficit, or budget deficit, the opposite of budget surplus. The term may be applied to the budget of a government, private company, or individual. A central point of controversy in economics, government deficit spending was first identified as a necessary economic tool by John Maynard Keynes in the wake of the Great Depression.

== Controversy ==
Government deficit spending is a central point of controversy in economics, with prominent economists holding differing views.

The mainstream economics position is that deficit spending is desirable and necessary as part of countercyclical fiscal policy, but that there should not be a structural deficit (i.e., permanent deficit): the government should run deficits during recessions to compensate for the shortfall in aggregate demand, but should run surpluses in boom times so that there is no net deficit over an economic cycle (i.e., only run cyclical deficits and not structural deficits). This is derived from Keynesian economics, and gained acceptance during the period between the Great Depression in the 1930s and post-WWII in the 1950s.

This position is attacked from both sides: advocates of federal-level fiscal conservatism argue that deficit spending is always bad policy, while some post-Keynesian economists—particularly neo-chartalists or proponents of Modern Monetary Theory—argue that deficit spending is necessary for the issuance of new money, and not only for fiscal stimulus. According to most economists, during recessions the government can stimulate the economy by intentionally running a deficit.

The deficit spending requested by John Maynard Keynes for overcoming crises is the fiscal side of his economy theory. As investment equates to real saving, money assets that build up are equivalent to debt capacity. Therefore, the excess saving of money in time of crisis should correspond to increased levels of borrowing, as this generally doesn't happen - the result is intensification of the crisis, as revenues from which money could be saved decline while a higher level of debt is needed to compensate for the collapsing revenues. The state's deficit enables a correspondent buildup of money assets for the private sector and prevents the breakdown of the economy, preventing private money savings to be run down by private debt.

The monetary mechanism describing how revenue surpluses enforce corresponding expense surpluses, and how these in turn lead to economic breakdown was explained by Wolfgang Stützel much later by the means of his Balances Mechanics.

William Vickrey, awarded the 1996 Nobel Memorial Prize in Economic Sciences, identified deficits being viewed as profligate spending as his #1 fallacy of Financial Fundamentalism when he commented:

This fallacy seems to stem from a false analogy to borrowing by individuals. Current reality is almost the exact opposite. Deficits add to the net disposable income of individuals, to the extent that government disbursements that constitute income to recipients exceed that abstracted from disposable income in taxes, fees, and other charges. This added purchasing power, when spent, provides markets for private production, inducing producers to invest in additional plant capacity, which will form part of the real heritage left to the future. This is in addition to whatever public investment takes place in infrastructure, education, research, and the like. Larger deficits, sufficient to recycle savings out of a growing gross domestic product (GDP) in excess of what can be recycled by profit-seeking private investment, are not an economic sin but an economic necessity. Deficits in excess of a gap growing as a result of the maximum feasible growth in real output might indeed cause problems, but we are nowhere near that level. Even the analogy itself is faulty. If General Motors, AT&T, and individual households had been required to balance their budgets in the manner being applied to the Federal government, there would be no corporate bonds, no mortgages, no bank loans, and many fewer automobiles, telephones, and houses.

— 15 Fatal Fallacies of Financial Fundamentalism

=== Fiscal conservatism ===
Advocates of fiscal conservatism reject Keynesianism by arguing that government should always run a balanced budget (and a surplus to pay down any outstanding debt), and that deficit spending is always bad policy. The neoclassical-inclined Chicago school of economics has supported fiscal conservative ideas. Numerous states of the United States have a balanced budget amendment to their state constitution, and the Stability and Growth Pact of the European Monetary Union punishes government deficits of 3% of GDP or greater.

Proponents of fiscal conservatism date back to Adam Smith, founder of modern economics. Fiscal conservatism was the dominant position until the Great Depression, associated with the gold standard and expressed in the now outdated Treasury View that government fiscal policy is ineffective.

The usual argument against deficit spending is the Government-Household analogy: households should not run deficits—one should have money before one spends it, from prudence—and that what is correct for a household is correct for a nation and its government. A similar argument is that deficit spending today will require increased taxation in the future, thus burdening future generations. (See generational accounting for discussion.)

Others argue that because debt is both owed by and owed to private individuals, there is no net debt burden of government debt, just wealth transfer (redistribution) from those who owe debt (government, backed by tax payers) to those who hold debt (holders of government bonds).

A related line of argument, associated with the Austrian school of economics, is that government deficits are inflationary. Anything other than mild or moderate inflation is generally accepted in economics to be a bad thing. This is argued to be because in practice governments pay off debts by printing money, increasing the money supply and creating inflation, and is taken further by some as an argument against fiat money and in favor of hard money, especially the gold standard.

=== Post-Keynesian economics ===
Some Post-Keynesian economists argue that deficit spending is necessary, either to create the money supply (Chartalism) or to satisfy demand for savings in excess of what can be satisfied by private investment.

Chartalists argue that deficit spending is logically necessary because, in their view, fiat money is created by deficit spending: fiat money cannot be collected in taxes before it is issued and spent; the amount of fiat money in circulation is exactly the government debt—money spent but not collected in taxes. In a quip, "fiat money governments are 'spend and tax', not 'tax and spend'"—deficit spending comes first.

Chartalists argue that nations are fundamentally different from households. Governments in a fiat money system which only have debt in their own currency can issue other liabilities, their fiat money, to pay off their interest bearing bond debt. They cannot go bankrupt involuntarily because this fiat money is what is used in their economy to settle debts, while household liabilities are not so used. This view is summarized as:

But it is hard to understand how the concept of "budget busting" applies to a government which, as a sovereign issuer of its own currency, can always create dollars to spend. There is, in other words, no budget to "bust". A national "budget" is merely an account of national spending priorities, and does not represent an external constraint in the manner of a household budget.

Continuing in this vein, Chartalists argue that a structural deficit is necessary for monetary expansion in an expanding economy: if the economy grows, the money supply should as well, which should be accomplished by government deficit spending. Private sector savings are equal to government sector deficits, to the penny. In the absence of sufficient deficit spending, money supply can increase by increasing financial leverage in the economy—the amount of bank money grows, while the base money supply remains unchanged or grows at a slower rate, and thus the ratio (leverage = credit/base) increases—which can lead to a credit bubble and a financial crisis.

Chartalism is a small minority view in economics; while it has had advocates over the years, and influenced Keynes, who specifically credited it, a notable proponent was Ukrainian-American economist Abba P. Lerner, who founded the school of Neo-Chartalism, and advocated deficit spending in his theory of functional finance. A contemporary center of Neo-Chartalism is the Kansas City School of economics.

Chartalists, like other Keynesians, accept the paradox of thrift, which argues that identifying behavior of individual households and the nation as a whole commits the fallacy of composition; while the paradox of thrift (and thus deficit spending for fiscal stimulus) is widely accepted in economics, the Chartalist form is not.

An alternative argument for the necessity of deficits was given by U.S. economist William Vickrey, who argued that deficits were necessary to satisfy demand for savings in excess of what can be satisfied by private investment.

Larger deficits, sufficient to recycle savings out of a growing gross domestic product (GDP) in excess of what can be recycled by profit-seeking private investment, are not an economic sin but an economic necessity.

== Government deficits ==
When the outlay of a government (i.e., the total of its purchases of goods and services, transfers in grants to individuals and corporations, and its net interest payments) exceeds its tax revenues, the government budget is said to be in deficit; government spending in excess of tax receipts is known as deficit spending. For a government that uses accrual accounting (rather than cash accounting) the budget balance is calculated using only spending on current operations, with expenditure on new capital assets excluded.

Governments usually issue bonds to match their deficits. They can be bought by its Central Bank through open market operations. Otherwise the debt issuance can increase the level of (i) public debt, (ii) private sector net worth, (iii) debt service (interest payments), and (iv) interest rates. (See Crowding out below.) Deficit spending may, however, be consistent with public debt remaining stable as a proportion of GDP, depending on the level of GDP growth.

The opposite of a budget deficit is a budget surplus; in this case, tax revenues exceed government purchases and transfer payments. For the public sector to be in deficit implies that the private sector (domestic and foreign) is in surplus. An increase in public indebtedness must necessarily therefore correspond to an equal decrease in private sector net indebtedness. In other words, deficit spending permits the private sector to accumulate net worth.

On average, through the economic cycle, most governments have tended to run budget deficits, as can be seen from the large debt balances accumulated by governments across the world.

=== Keynesian effect ===
Following John Maynard Keynes, many economists recommend deficit spending to moderate or end a recession, especially a severe one. When the economy has high unemployment, an increase in government purchases creates a market for business output, creating income and encouraging increases in consumer spending, which creates further increases in the demand for business output. (This is the multiplier effect.) This raises the real gross domestic product (GDP) and the employment of labour, and if all else is constant, lowers the unemployment rate. (The connection between demand for GDP and unemployment is called Okun's law.)

The increased size of the market, due to government deficits, can further stimulate the economy by raising business profitability and spurring optimism, which encourages private fixed investment in factories, machines, and the like to rise. This accelerator effect stimulates demand further and encourages rising employment.

Similarly, running a government surplus or reducing its deficit reduces consumer and business spending and raises unemployment. This can lower the inflation rate. Any use of the government deficit to steer the macro-economy is called fiscal policy.

A deficit does not simply stimulate demand. If private investment is stimulated, that increases the ability of the economy to supply output in the long run. Also, if the government's deficit is spent on such things as infrastructure, basic research, public health, and education, that can also increase potential output in the long run. Finally, the high demand that a government deficit provides may actually allow greater growth of potential supply, following Verdoorn's law.

Deficit spending may create inflation, or encourage existing inflation to persist. For example, in the United States Vietnam-war era deficits encouraged inflation. This is especially true at low unemployment rates. But government deficits are not the only cause of inflation: It can arise due to such supply-side shocks as the oil crises of the 1970s and inflation left over from the past (e.g., inflationary expectations and the price/wage spiral).

If equilibrium is located on the classical range of the supply graph, an increase in government spending will lead to inflation without affecting unemployment. There must also be enough money circulating in the system to allow inflation to persist, so that inflation depends on monetary policy.

=== Loanable funds ===
Many economists believe government deficits influence the economy through the loanable funds market, whose existence Chartalists and other Post-Keynesians dispute. Government borrowing in this market increases the demand for loanable funds and thus (ignoring other changes) pushes up interest rates. Rising interest rates can crowd out, or discourage, fixed private investment spending, canceling out some or even all of the demand stimulus arising from the deficit—and perhaps hurting long-term supply-side growth.

Increased deficits also raise the amount of total income received, which raises the amount of saving done by individuals and corporations and thus the supply of loanable funds, lowering interest rates. Thus, crowding out is a problem only when the economy is already close to full employment (say, at about 4% unemployment) and the scope for increasing income and saving is blocked by resource constraints (potential output).

Despite a government debt that exceeded GDP in 1945, the U.S. saw the long prosperity of the 1950s and 1960s. The growth of the supply side, it seems, was not hurt by the large deficits and debts.

A government deficit increases government debt. In many countries the government borrows by selling bonds rather than borrowing from banks. The most important burden of this debt is the interest that must be paid to bond-holders, which restricts a government's ability to raise its outlays or cut taxes to attain other goals.

=== Crowding out ===
Usually when economists use the term "crowding out" they are referring to the government spending using up financial and other resources that would otherwise be used by private enterprise. However, some commentators use "crowding out" to refer to government providing a service or good that would otherwise be a business opportunity for private industry.

=== Unintentional deficits ===
National government deficits may be intentional, a result of policy decisions, or unintentional. When an economy goes into a recession, deficits usually rise in the more affluent countries. Revenue from progressive taxes based on economic activity (income, expenditure, or transactions) falls. Other sources of tax revenue such as wealth taxes, notably property taxes, are not subject to recessions, though they are subject to asset price bubbles. Transfer payments due to increased unemployment and reduced household income rise.

=== Automatic vs. active deficit policies ===
Most economists favor the use of automatic stabilization over active or discretionary use of deficits to fight mild recessions (or surpluses to combat inflation). Active policy-making takes too long for politicians to institute and too long to affect the economy. Often, the medicine ends up affecting the economy only after its disease has been cured, leaving the economy with side-effects such as inflation. For example, President John F. Kennedy proposed tax cuts in response to the high unemployment of 1960, but these were instituted only in 1964 and impacted the economy only in 1965 or 1966 and the increased debt encouraged inflation, reinforcing the effect of Vietnam war deficit spending.

== Structural and cyclical deficit ==
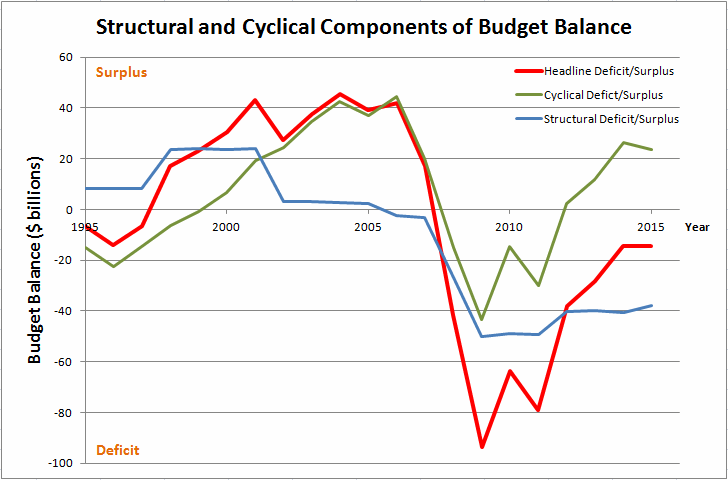
Structural (blue) and cyclical (green) components are summed to give the headline deficit/surplus (red) for a hypothetical economy.

Structural and cyclical deficits are two components of deficit spending. These terms are especially applied to public sector spending which contributes to the budget balance of the overall economy of a country. The total budget deficit, or headline deficit, is equal to the sum of the structural deficit and the cyclical deficit (or surplus/es).

=== Cyclical deficit ===
A cyclical (temporary) deficit is a deficit that is related to the business or economic cycle. The business cycle is the period of time it takes for an economy to move from expansion to contraction, until it begins to expand again. This cycle can last anywhere from several months to many years, and does not follow a predictable pattern.

The cyclical deficit is the deficit experienced at the low point of this cycle when there are lower levels of business activity and higher levels of unemployment. This leads to lower government revenues from taxation and higher government expenditure on things like social security, which may cause the economy to go into deficit. While the cyclical component is affected by government decisions, it is mainly influenced by national and international economic conditions which can be significantly beyond government control.

=== Structural deficit ===
A structural (permanent) deficit differs from a cyclical deficit in that it exists regardless of the point in the business cycle due to an underlying imbalance in government revenues and expenditures. Thus, even at the high point of the business cycle when revenues are high the country's economy may still be in deficit.

The structural component of the budget is used by some economists as an indication of a government's financial management, as it indicates the underlying balance between long-term government revenues and expenditure, while removing factors that are mainly attributable to the business cycle. Other economists see the structural deficit as simply a reflection of the implied discretionary fiscal stance of the government, that is, a structural deficit would be an expansionary fiscal stance that promotes at least nominal economic growth.

Where deficits are being funded by borrowing, a structural deficit is seen by some economists as an issue for a government as even at the high points of the business cycle the government may need to continue to borrow and thus continue to accumulate debt. According to them, this would lead to continued "deterioration" of the debt-to-GDP ratio, a basic measure of the health of an economy and an indication of the country's ability to pay off its debts.

Other economists believe that provided the debt is issued in the country's own currency, and provided that currency 'floats' freely against other currencies, and provided the overall level of the deficit is not so large as to cause excessive inflation, then structural deficits are harmless. Those economists who believe that structural deficits need to be reduced argue that structural deficit issues can only be addressed by explicit and direct government policies, primarily involving reducing government spending or increasing taxation.

An alternative in countries which have fiat money is to address high levels of debt and a poor debt-to-GDP ratio by monetising the debt, essentially creating more money to be used to pay off the debt. Monetising the debt can lead to high levels of inflation, but with proper fiscal control this can be minimised or even avoided. Both it and the final option of defaulting on the debt are thought to be poor results for investors. There having been recent incidents involving quantitative easing in the UK, the U.S. and the Eurozone following the 2008 financial crisis. These are the first instances of either since the dropping of the gold standard.

Structural deficits may be planned, or may be unintentional due to poor economic management or a fundamental lack of economic capacity in a country. In a planned structural deficit, the government may commit to spending money on the future of the country in order to improve the productive potential of the economy, for example investing in infrastructure, education, or transport, with the intention that this investment will yield long-term economic gains. If these investments work out as planned the structural deficit will be dealt with over the long-term due to the returns on investment. However, if expenditures continue to exceed revenues, the structural deficit will worsen.

A government may also knowingly plan the budget to be in deficit in order to sustain the country's standard of living and continue its obligations to the citizens, although this would generally be an indication of poor economic management. Ongoing planned structural deficits may eventually lead to a crisis of confidence in investors regarding the country's ability to pay the debt, as seen in the aftermath of the 2008 financial crisis in several European countries, especially the Greek government-debt crisis and 2008–2014 Spanish financial crisis.

=== Structural and cyclical surplus ===
Structural and cyclical surpluses are the opposite of the deficits described above. With a cyclical surplus, at the high point of the business cycle government revenue will be expected to be higher and government expenditure lower, meaning revenue exceeds expenditure and the government experiences a surplus. Likewise, a structural surplus is when the government budget is fundamentally operating at a surplus regardless of its point in the business cycle.

=== Interplay of structural and cyclical components ===
The overall government budget balance is determined by the sum of the cyclical deficit or surplus and the structural deficit or surplus (refer to chart). Therefore, for example, a cyclical surplus could mask an underlying structural deficit, as the overall budget may appear to be in surplus if the cyclical surplus is greater than the structural deficit. In this case, as economic conditions deteriorated and the budget went into cyclical deficit, the structural and cyclical deficits would then compound leading to higher deficits and more dire economic conditions.

An example of this occurred in Australia during the later years of the Howard government. From 2009 Treasury attempted to separate cyclical and structural components of the budget balance, and first started publishing estimates of the structural component. Treasury showed that despite a run of large and often unexpected headline surpluses, the Australian economy was in fact in structural deficit from at least 2006–2007, and was deteriorating as far back as 2002–2003. At this time they determined that despite a headline surplus of A$17.2 billion in 2006–2007, there was an underlying structural deficit of around $3 billion, or 0.3% of GDP.

This structural deficit was caused by a mining boom leading to extremely high revenues and large surpluses for several consecutive years, which the Howard government then used to fuel spending and tax cuts, rather than saving or investing them to cover future cyclical downturns. During the 2008 financial crisis, revenues quickly and significantly declined and the underlying structural deficit was exposed and exacerbated, which then had to be dealt with by later governments. By 2008–2009 when the budget had a headline deficit of $32 billion, the structural deficit was out to around $50 billion. In 2013 it was estimated the structural deficit remained at about $40 billion, or 2.5% of GDP.

=== Criticism ===
Economist Chris Dillow has questioned the distinction between cyclical and structural deficits, and this has received support from other leading economists. He contends that there are too many variables involved to allow a clear distinction to be made, especially when dealing with current circumstances rather than retrospectively, and suggests that the concept of structural deficits may be used more for political purposes than analytical purposes. The piece largely centred on the UK Labour government 1997–2010 of which Chris Dillow was a strong supporter and criticism that they ran a large structural deficit. Ed Balls (who was Economic Secretary to the Treasury from May 2006 to June 2007) acknowledged that, unbeknownst to them at the time, in 2007 they were running a structural deficit. Economist and Professor Bill Mitchell has also questioned the misuse of the term 'structural deficit', particularly in the Australian context.

Martin Wolf argues that nobody knows what the structural or cyclically adjusted balance is, and that it is least knowable precisely when such knowledge is most essential, namely, when the economy is experiencing a boom. He provides two examples of widely divergent IMF estimates of the average structural fiscal balance of Ireland and Spain for the period 2000–2007. The estimates were made in 2008 and in 2012 and Wolf stresses that they were post-fact estimates and not predictions. Specifically, the IMF declared in 2008 that Ireland had run an average structural surplus of 1.3% of GDP per year between 2000 and 2007, and Spain had an average structural surplus of 0.5% of GDP per year over the same period. Four years later, the IMF decided that, for this same 8-year period, Ireland's annual average structural balance was four percentage points worse than it had thought in April 2008, estimating that Ireland had been running an average structural fiscal deficit of 2.7% of GDP. For Spain, the 2012 IMF estimate differed by 1.7 percentage points, estimating this time that Spain had been running and average structural fiscal deficit of 1.2% of GDP in the years 2000–2007.

Bruce Yandle writing for Reason, stated in 2022 as a result of rising inflation that, "[It would be prudent to] Blame Washington, Not Moscow, for Surging Inflation; Few politicians are willing to admit deficit spending is the larger cause."

== See also ==
- Inflation
- Functional finance
- Deficit (disambiguation)
- Public debt
- Balanced Budget Amendment
- Keynesian economics
- Fiscal policy

== Bibliography ==
- William J. Baumol, Alan S. Blinder (2005). Economics: Principles and Policy. Thomson South-Western. ISBN 0-324-22113-4.
- Mitchell, Bill: Deficit spending 101 – Part 1, Part 2, Part 3; Neo-Chartalist (Modern Monetary Theory) perspective on deficit spending
- Vickrey, William (October 5, 1996). "Fifteen Fatal Fallacies of Financial Fundamentalism: A Disquisition on Demand Side Economics". Paper was written one week before the author's death, three days before he received the Nobel Memorial Prize in Economics.
- McGregor, Michael A., Driscoll, Paul D., McDowell, Walter (2010) “Head’s Broadcasting in America: A Survey of Electronic Media”. Boston, Massachusetts: Allyn & Bacon p. 180.
