= Balanced budget =

Financial plan where revenues equal expenses

A balanced budget (particularly that of a government) is a budget in which revenues are equal to expenditures. Thus, neither a budget deficit nor a budget surplus exists (the accounts "balance"). More generally, it is a budget that has no budget deficit, but could possibly have a budget surplus. A cyclically balanced budget is a budget that is not necessarily balanced year-to-year but is balanced over the economic cycle, running a surplus in boom years and running a deficit in lean years, with these offsetting over time.

Balanced budgets and the associated topic of budget deficits are a contentious point within academic economics and within politics. Some economists argue that moving from a budget deficit to a balanced budget decreases inflation and interest rates, increases investment, shrinks trade deficits and helps the economy grow faster in the longer term. Other economists downplay the need for balanced budgets among countries that have the power to issue their own currency, and argue that government spending helps boost productivity, innovation and savings in the private sector.

== Economic views ==
Mainstream economics mainly advocates a cyclic balanced budget, arguing from the perspective of Keynesian economics that permitting the deficit to vary provides the economy with an automatic stabilizer—budget deficits provide fiscal stimulus in lean times, while budget surpluses provide restraint in boom times. Keynesian economics does not advocate for fiscal stimulus when the existing government debt is already significant.

Alternative currents in the mainstream and branches of heterodox economics argue differently, with some arguing that budget deficits are always harmful, and others arguing that budget deficits are not only beneficial, but also necessary.

Schools which often argue against the effectiveness of budget deficits as cyclical tools include the freshwater school of mainstream economics and neoclassical economics more generally, and the Austrian school of economics. Budget deficits are argued to be necessary by some within post-Keynesian economics, notably the chartalist school:

Larger deficits, sufficient to recycle savings out of a growing gross domestic product (GDP) in excess of what can be recycled by profit-seeking private investment, are not an economic sin but an economic necessity.

Budget deficits can be calculated by subtracting the total planned expenditure from the total available budget. This will then show either a budget deficit (a negative difference) or a budget surplus (a positive difference).

=== Modern Monetary Theory ===
Modern Monetary Theory (MMT) is a school of thought founded by economist Bill Mitchell and Hedge Fund Manager Warren Mosler, and has since been further developed by economists such as Stephanie Kelton and L. Randall Wray. MMT advocates argue that a balanced budget is not required in the short term, or over the course of the business cycle in countries with monetary sovereignty, defined as follows:

A monetary sovereign is a country which:

1. Issues its own currency,
2. Does not fix its currency's exchange rate to another currency or commodity, and
3. Does not have significant levels of foreign currency-denominated debt.

Because such a country can issue its own currency, it can never run out of that currency and does not need to increase revenues in order to increase expenditure. Thus, the only constraint on expenditures is the inflation which it may generate if the economy is making full use of its capital and labour. MMT advocates therefore argue for that budget deficits should be used to achieve full employment through a government employment program called a 'jobs guarantee'. This is based on the view that a government deficit creates a 'private sector surplus' by increasing incomes and creating savings.

== Political views ==
=== United States ===
In the United States, the fiscal conservatism movement believes that balanced budgets are an important goal. Every state other than Vermont has a balanced budget amendment, providing some form of ban on deficits, while the Oregon kicker bans surpluses of greater than 2% of revenue. The Colorado Taxpayer Bill of Rights (the TABOR amendment) also bans surpluses and requires the state to refund taxpayers in event of a budget surplus.

The last time that the budget was balanced or had a surplus was the 2001 United States federal budget.

Numerous sources have stated that as of 2023, a balanced budget is no longer possible without massive reductions in spending by the United States federal government according to the Congressional Budget Office and several independent sources. Extreme spending reductions on numerous entitlements would also not likely be popular, even if such cuts would be sufficient to bring a balanced budget to the United States, "Federal debt will rise from 98 percent of GDP in 2023 to 181 percent in 2053."

=== Sweden ===
Following the over-borrowing in both the public and private sector that led to the Swedish banking crisis of the early 1990s and under influence from a series of reports on the future demographic challenges, a wide political consensus developed on fiscal prudence. In the year 2000 this was enshrined in a law that stated a goal of a surplus of 2% over the business cycle, to be used to pay off the public debt and to secure the long-term future for the cherished welfare state. Today the goal is 1% over the business cycle, as the retirement pension is no longer considered a government expenditure.

=== United Kingdom ===
In 2015 George Osborne, the Chancellor of the Exchequer, announced that he intended to implement a law whereby the government must deliver a budget surplus if the economy is growing. Academics have criticised this proposal with Cambridge University professor Ha-Joon Chang saying the chancellor was turning a blind eye to the complexities of a 21st-century economy that demanded governments remain flexible and responsive to changing global events.

Since 1980, there have been only six years in which a budget surplus has been delivered: twice when the Conservatives' John Major was Chancellor of the Exchequer, in 1988 and 1989, and four times when Labour's Gordon Brown was Chancellor, in 1998, 1999, 2000 and 2001.

== Balanced budget multiplier ==
Because of the multiplier effect, it is possible to change aggregate demand (Y) keeping a balanced budget. Suppose the government increases its expenditures (G), balancing the increase by an increase in taxes (T). Since only part of the income taken away from households would have actually been spent, the change in consumption expenditure will be smaller than the change in taxes. Therefore, the net change in spending (increased government spending and decreased consumption spending) at this point is positive, and the induced second and subsequent rounds of spending are also positive, giving a positive result for the balanced budget multiplier. In general, and in the absence of induced changes in interest rates and the price level, a change in the balanced budget will change aggregate demand by an amount equal to the change in spending. Let the consumption function be:

$$C = c_0 + c_1 \left ( Y - T \right ).$$

The goods market equilibrium equation is:

$$Y=C+I+G+NX$$

where I is exogenous physical investment and NX is net exports. Using the first equation in the second one yields the following solution for Y:

$$Y= \frac {1} {1 - c_1} \left ( c_0 + I + G+NX - c_1 T \right ),$$

and taking differences of the variables and setting $\Delta I=\Delta NX=0$ and $\Delta T=\Delta G,$ we have

$$\Delta Y=\frac{1}{1-c_1}(\Delta G -c_1 \Delta G )=\Delta G.$$

Then dividing through by $\Delta G$ gives the balanced budget multiplier as

$\frac{\Delta Y}{\Delta G}\vert_{\Delta T=\Delta G}=1.$

This is named the Haavelmo theorem which demonstrates that the balanced budget multiplier rises its maximum value when any increase of the public spending $\Delta G$ is corresponded by an equal increase of the fiscal imposition $\Delta T$, so as to avoid a higher level of public debt. The deficit spending, that is the growth of public spending without an equal amount of monetary entrance into the State Treasury, is always a less efficient political choice in order to speed up the GNP.

However, the balanced budget is made smaller when resulting changes in the interest rate change investment spending and money demand and when resulting changes in the price level affect money demand.

== See also ==
- Deficit spending
- Sectoral balances
- Balanced budget amendment (United States government)
- Budget-balanced mechanism
