= Fiscalism =

Economic philosophy and theory

Fiscalism is a term sometimes used to refer the economic theory that the government should rely on fiscal policy as the main instrument of macroeconomic policy. Fiscalism in this sense is contrasted with monetarism, which is associated with reliance on monetary policy. Fiscalists reject monetarism in a non-convertible floating rate system as inefficient if not also ineffective. There are two types of fiscalism: (1) contained fiscalism, which does not allow the economy to grow or decline as much as possible; and elevated fiscalism, which does not allow the economy to decline but allows for the economy to grow unrestrained.

== Roots ==
Fiscalism relies heavily on Keynesian theories, which states that an active government intervention is necessary to ensure economic growth and economic stability. For fiscalists, employment is of primary concern. Y (income) is the independent variable in PY = MV (where P = price level, M = amount of money, V = velocity/turnover of money), changes in which affect effective demand. So fiscalists hold that Y needs to be controlled through fiscal policy, which affects effective demand. Effective demand draws forth investment to meet profit opportunity, and effective demand is income-dependent, since consumption cannot be funded by drawing down savings, selling assets, or financed by borrowing (e.g. monetary debt) sustainably. If supply and demand are stabilized at optimal resource use, then unemployment is reduced.

== Fiscalism and Modern Monetary Theory ==
The holy grail of macroeconomics is full employment along with price stability, which implies highly efficient use of resources while controlling price level. In the first place, Modern Monetary Theory (MMT) rejects the monetarist explanation virtually in toto, arguing that it is based on an incorrect view of actual operations of the Treasury, central bank, and commercial banking, and how they interact. Secondly, MMT explains how to succeed in the quest for the holy grail through employment of the sectoral balance approach developed by Wynne Godley and functional finance developed by Abba Lerner. The thrust of this approach is to maintain effective demand sufficient for purchase of production (supply) at full employment by offsetting non-government saving desire with the currency issuer's fiscal balance. This stabilizes aggregate demand and aggregate supply at full employment (adjusting aggregate demand with regard to changes in population and productivity) without risking inflation arising owing to excessive demand.

This does not apply to price level rising due to supply shock, such as an oil crisis provoked by a cartel exerting a monopoly, or shortage of real resources, e.g. due to natural disaster, war, or climate. This is a separate issue and must be addressed differently according to MMT. In a non-convertible floating rate monetary system, the currency issuer is not constrained operationally. The only constraint is real resources. If effective demand outruns the capacity of the economy to expand to meet it, then inflation will result. If effective demand falls short of the capacity of the economy to produce at full employment, then the economy will contract (e.g. cause a recession), an output gap open, and unemployment will rise.

This view is based on a Treasury-based monetary regime in which money is created through currency issuance mediated by government fiscal expenditure. Issuance of Treasury securities to offset deficits functions as a reserve drain, which functions as a monetary operation that enables the central bank to hit its target rate rather than being a fiscal operation involving financing. Similarly, taxes are seen not as a funding operation for government expenditure but as a means to withdraw non-government net financial assets created government expenditure in order to control effective demand and thereby reduce inflationary pressure as needed iaw the sectoral balance approach and functional finance.

This latest view is quite the opposite of the credit-based monetary presumptions of monetarists, which MMT regards as appropriate to a convertible fixed-rate regime like the gold standard but not to the current non-convertible floating rate system that began when then United States president Richard Nixon shut the gold window (as part of the Nixon shock) on 15 August 1971, and was later adopted by most nations, excepting those that pegged their currencies, ran currency boards, or gave up currency sovereignty as did members of the European Monetary Union in adopting the euro as a common currency.

MMT economists do not recommend the adoption of a Treasury-based monetary system. Rather, they are asserting that the present monetary system is already Treasury-based operationally, even when governments choose to impose political restraints that mimic obsolete practices and create the impression that these are operationally necessary. MMT also recommends an employer assurance program (ELR, JG) to create a buffer stock of employed that the private sector can draw on as needed. This reduces idle resources and presents the possibility of achieving actual full employment (allowing 2% for transitional) along with price stability, which monetarism presumes inflationary. The ELR program also establishes a wage floor as price anchor for price stability.
