= Taxpayers' money =

Political phrase

Taxpayers' money or taxpayer dollars is a phrase that supposes government spending is dispersed from an aggregation of tax revenues, and emphasises a putative cohort of taxpayers from whom said revenue is collected. The phrase is associated with Margaret Thatcher, who asserted in 1983 that "the state has no source of money, other than the money people earn themselves. If the state wishes to spend more it can only do so by borrowing your savings or by taxing you more."

Economist L. Randall Wray said that while subnational governments often rely on revenues (from taxation or otherwise) to underwrite public expenditures, national governments that have significant control over their own currency supply are not so strictly constrained. In the United States, for instance, US Federal Reserve chairmen Alan Greenspan and Ben Bernanke both noted that when a new national expenditure is ordered, the government simply creates funds immediately and without any consideration of revenue. Bernanke said explicitly that government spending "is not taxpayer money. We simply use the computer to mark up the size of the account." The lack of causality between tax-generated revenue and such government spending is one phenomenon explained by modern monetary theory.

Economist Stephanie Kelton summarised that the phrase presents a worldview in which the taxpayer "is at the center of the monetary universe because of the belief that the government has no money of its own." The exact cohort of people said to count as "taxpayers" is usually left undefined, but is often meant to imply only heads of household, homeowners, or business owners, while people paying sales taxes or paying property taxes indirectly through rent are excluded. Taxpayers' money may be described with emotional language, such as "hard-earned", while the targets of government spending may be described with pejoratives such as "undeserving". (Sociologist Jakob Feinig coined the term "monetary silencing" to refer to rhetorical attempts to restrict financial agency to a subset of the population.) Concomittantly, the phrase can acquire racist overtones. "Taxpayer dollars" were invoked in opposition to racially desegregated education in the United States under the premise that white people paid more taxes than black people.
