= Warren Mosler =

American economist (born 1949)

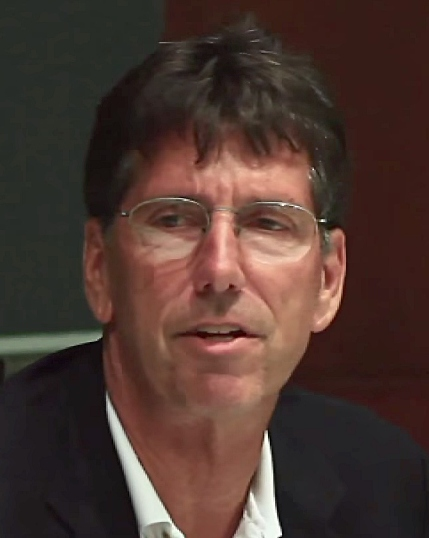
- Mosler in 2012

Personal details
- Born: September 18, 1949 (age 76) Manchester, Connecticut, U.S.
- Party: Independent
- Education: University of Connecticut, Storrs (BA)

Academic work
- Discipline: Modern Monetary Theory; Macroeconomics; Monetary policy
- School or tradition: Modern Monetary Theory

Warren Mosler (born September 18, 1949) is an American hedge fund executive, financier, and politician. He is a co-founder of the Center for Full Employment And Price Stability at University of Missouri-Kansas City and the founder of Mosler Automotive.

Mosler is a proponent and research financier of Modern Monetary Theory. He was awarded an honorary doctorate by the Franklin University Switzerland, and in 2014 was appointed visiting professor at the University of Bergamo, Italy.

Mosler has run as an independent for multiple offices including: United States president, a delegate to Congress three times, and lieutenant governor. In 2018, he ran unsuccessfully for governor of the U.S. Virgin Islands as an independent.

== Early life ==
Mosler attended the University of Connecticut where he graduated with a degree in economics.

He initially went on to work at the Savings Bank of Manchester in Manchester, Connecticut in 1973. Next he went on to work in Hartford for Bache and Co. before moving to New York City. From there he would go on to work on Wall Street, specifically, Bankers Trust NYC, and then William Blair in Chicago.

== Hedge fund career ==
In 1982 he founded a hedge fund, Illinois Income Investors, where he was responsible for several strategies utilizing government securities, mortgage backed securities, LIBOR swaps and LIBOR caps, and financial futures markets. By the late 1990s, most of the firm had been largely turned over to his partners, as he had disagreements on the direction of some of its investments.

Mosler's hedge fund was informed by his developing theories. After his departure at the end of 1997, Mosler's former business lost money when several dealers refused to make payments on credit default swaps on Russian debt. Separately, Mosler's attributed the crisis to the fixed exchange rate Russia had at the time.

== Academic work ==
Mosler met economist Arthur Laffer through a referral from Donald Rumsfeld. At a meeting of Social Policy in NYC, William Vickrey suggested Mosler to seek out post-Keynesian economists L. Randall Wray, Bill Mitchell, and Stephanie Kelton to discuss his ideas. These post-Keynesian economists had been familiar with chartalism, and agreed with Mosler's analysis. Laffer's staff economist Mark McNary provided editorial and research assistance in Mosler's self-published monograph, "Soft-Currency Economics".

Academically, he is known for his writings on Modern Monetary Theory, an economic theory that describes the way fiat money is created and used in modern economies. His unorthodox views have gained a substantial following among participants in informal internet discussion groups and academics.

In 2010 he published Seven Deadly Innocent Frauds of Economic Policy outlining errors that can be made in the development of policy and explains what he deems "true" as proper alternatives.

In recognition that his "leadership in the field of economics is notable" Mosler was awarded an honorary doctorate from Franklin University Switzerland in 2014, after the Mosler Economic Policy Center (a center founded by him and aimed at encouraging education and research in new concepts and methods of economic policy analysis) had promoted a lecture about functional finance at Franklin the year before.

In 2014 he became visiting professor at the University of Bergamo.

=== Mosler's law ===
He is attributed with creating Mosler's law dealing with fiscal policy of a nation during a recession. Specifically, Mosler's law states that "[...] no financial crisis [is] so deep that a sufficiently large fiscal adjustment cannot deal with it." He stated that the recent recession could have been alleviated much quicker from a full payroll tax holiday that suspended FICA taxes (or massive government spending increases, depending on one's politics) until unemployment fell. He opposes overly high taxes since they discourage consumption within an economy but does agree a certain tax level is needed to guarantee citizens use the dollar as a currency. He is confident that inflation is a non-factor in his analysis given current procurement policy as long as there is sufficient excess capacity. In his theory the government has the complete ability to constantly expand net spending and guarantee consumption and growth. He supports unlimited FDIC deposit insurance for all bank deposits for US banks.

He stresses that federal spending is in no way constrained by tax revenues, therefore the government will always be able to make payments in its own currency, stating "Federal Government checks don't bounce". He goes on to state that any and all debt passed on to future generations will never be burdensome, since they will undoubtedly consume whatever is produced.

He developed much of his belief from his time as a hedge fund manager when many investors predicted the Italian government defaulting on bonds, whereas he predicted, correctly, that Italian government would not default and thus made considerable returns.

=== Economic views ===
==== Healthcare ====
Mosler supports government funding for full-time employment with full health care coverage for employees and dependents, thus triggering all firms providing health care to remain competitive. He states health cannot be viewed as a production cost, therefore the government should fund for at least 90% of the cost paid by the firms. Finally, he supports issuing medical debit cards to all citizens, for a fixed amount. This covers any medical costs and any amount above this will be covered by "catastrophe insurance". At the end of every year, citizens would receive a portion of their unused medical debit card.

==== Energy ====
In a brief proposal, Mosler stated the energy crisis could be solved by lowering the speed limit nationally to 30 mph. According to Mosler, this would cut gasoline consumption and pollution since automobiles run more efficiently at slower speeds, while also greatly increase the demand for public transportation. He states that such an initiative would eventually lead to a supply shock forcing prices down, and improve real terms of trade.

==== Housing ====
Mosler supports government purchases of houses in the foreclosure process from the bank at the lower of the fair market value or remaining mortgage balance. The government then would rent the house back to the original owner and after two years the house is put on the market with the original owner having the first rights of purchase.

==== Taxes ====
Mosler supports eliminating the income tax and replacing it with a real estate tax to "anchor the currency". He also supports eliminating tax advantages for any savings accounts, since he states savings do not increase investments necessarily. He supports luxury taxes being used to limit the consumption of undesirable goods.

== Political campaigns ==
In February 2009, Mosler declared his candidacy with the Federal Elections Commission to run for the office of President of the United States as an independent. In April 2010, he withdrew to run for a U.S. Senate seat in Connecticut, briefly as a Democrat, but ultimately as an independent. In the final tally he received 0.98% of the vote.

Mosler has run unsuccessfully three times for U.S. Virgin Islands delegate to the United States Congress; his last congressional race was in 2012.

In 2014, Mosler ran for lieutenant governor of the U.S. Virgin Islands as an independent, but quit the race early due to a difference of opinion with his running mate Soraya Diase Coffelt. In 2018, he ran unsuccessfully for governor of the US Virgin Islands as an independent candidate, coming in fourth with 4.7% of the vote.

== Automotive and maritime interests ==
Mosler developed several luxury sports cars and supercars, including the Consulier GTP and the Mosler MT900. Starting in 1985, his cars were marketed by startup company Consulier, later renamed Mosler Automotive.

His models were marked by excellent performance and high speeds. Mosler was so confident about one of his models, the Consulier GTP, that he offered a bounty of $25,000 to anyone who could beat it in a race. Car and Driver took up the gauntlet and defeated his car. Mosler noted that the model used in the race was a worn-out Consulier and even so offered to pay if he was allowed to use his own driver and replace the brake pads. Car and Driver refused. Mosler subsequently offered the challenge once more for a higher bounty of $100,000 and held an event at Sebring where the Consulier again proved to be far quicker than any other road car.

In the 1990s he developed environmentally friendly vehicles including both electric cars and composite-bodied automobiles. The company was sold in June 2013.

Mosler also designed his own catamaran that he prides on being much lighter, faster, and more fuel-efficient than other models. He is operating a unique 'tandem' four-hulled ferry to take passengers from St. Croix to St. Thomas. It was designed not to promote sea sickness, though its effectiveness is debated.

== Personal life ==
Around 2010, Mosler relocated to the U.S. Virgin Islands in order to participate in a government-sponsored economic growth initiative. In 2013, the New York Times described Warren as "transitioning into an active retirement". Warren currently lives full time in St. Croix in the U.S. Virgin Islands.

== Selected publications ==
- "Maximizing Price Stability in a Market Economy," Journal of Policy Modeling, January 2017, co authored by Professor Damiano Bruno Silipo, Università della Calabria
- "Critique of John B. Taylor's 'Expectations, Open Market Operations, and Changes in the Federal Funds Rate'," Journal of Post Keynesian Economics, forthcoming.
- "The Natural Rate of Interest Is Zero," with Mathew Forstater, JOURNAL OF ECONOMIC ISSUES, Vol. XXXIX No. 2, 2005
- "Public Sector Employment, Foreign Exchange and Trade, Achieving Full Employment," edited by Ellen Carlson and William F. Mitchell, pp. 62–71, vol. 12, ELRR: Sydney, 2001.
- "Unemployment and Fiscal Policy, Unemployment: The Tip of the Iceberg," William Mitchell and Ellen Carlson (eds.), pp. 219–231, CAER: Sydney, 2001.
- "Building a Palestinian Economy," Middle East Insight, pp. 57–59, Washington DC, June–July 2001.
- "Comment on 'In the Interests of Safety,' by Martin Mayer," in The Management of Global Financial Markets, edited by Jan Joost Teunissen, pp. 94–101, FONDAD: The Hague, 2000.
- "Exchange Rate Policy and Full Employment," The Path to Full Employment, Ellen Carlson and William F. Mitchell (eds.), pp. 12–22, vol. 11, ELRR: Sydney, 2000.
- "A General Framework for the Analysis of Currencies and Commodities", in Full Employment and Price Stability in a Global Economy, edited by Paul Davidson and Jan Kregel, pp. 166–177, Northampton: Edward Elgar Publishing, Inc, 1999.
- "Full Employment and Price Stability," Journal of Post Keynesian Economics, Vol. 20, No. 2, Winter 1997–98.

=== Monographs ===
- Soft Currency Economics II, ADS Incorporate, Kindle edition: 2012. Paper edition: 2013
- In alto il deficit! (Up with the deficit!, book written in Italian), foreword by Paolo Barnard, Edizioni Sì, 2012
- Seven Deadly Innocent Frauds of Economic Policy, foreword by James K. Galbraith, Valance, 2010
- Soft Currency Economics, www.mosler.org, 1993. Paper edition: AVM, 1995
