= Inflationism =

Economic policy

Inflationism is a heterodox economic, fiscal, or monetary policy, that predicts that a substantial level of inflation is harmless, desirable or even advantageous. Similarly, inflationist economists advocate for an inflationist policy.

Mainstream economics holds that inflation is a necessary evil, and advocates a low, stable level of inflation, and thus is largely opposed to inflationist policies – some inflation is necessary, but inflation beyond a low level is not desirable. However, deflation is often seen as a worse or equal danger, particularly within Keynesian economics, as well as Monetarist economics and in the theory of debt deflation.

Inflationism is not accepted within the economics community, and is often conflated with Modern Monetary Theory, which uses similar arguments, especially in relation to chartalism.

== Political debate ==
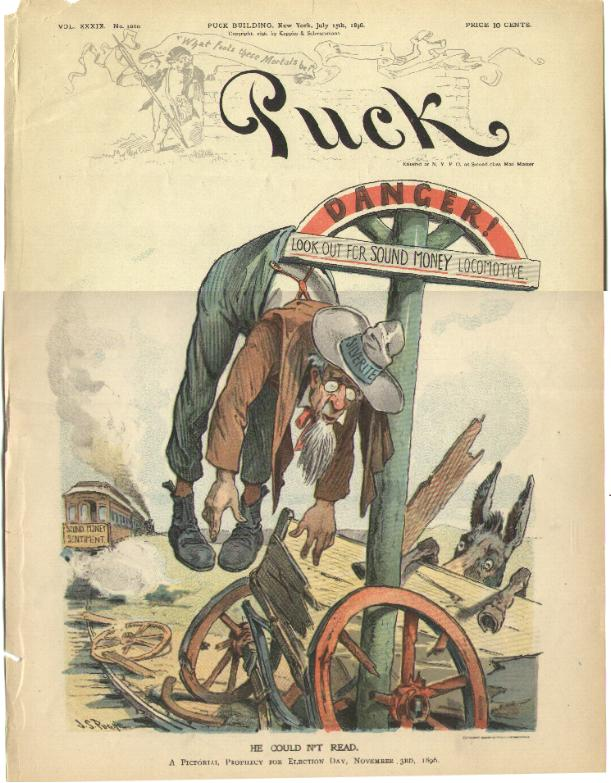
An 1896 cartoon showing a Free Silver farmer and a Democratic donkey whose wagon has been destroyed by the locomotive of sound money

In political debate, inflationism is opposed to hard currency, which believes that the real value of currency should be maintained.

In late 19th century United States, the Free Silver movement advocated the inflationary policy of free coinage of silver. This was a contentious political issue in the 40-year period 1873–1913, consistently defeated. Later, economist John Maynard Keynes described the effects of inflationism:

Lenin is said to have declared that the best way to destroy the capitalist system was to debauch the currency. By a continuing process of inflation, governments can confiscate, secretly and unobserved, an important part of the wealth of their citizens. By this method they not only confiscate, but they confiscate arbitrarily; and, while the process impoverishes many, it actually enriches some. The sight of this arbitrary rearrangement of riches strikes not only at security but [also] at confidence in the equity of the existing distribution of wealth.

Those to whom the system brings windfalls, beyond their deserts and even beyond their expectations or desires, become "profiteers," who are the object of the hatred of the bourgeoisie, whom the inflationism has impoverished, not less than of the proletariat. As the inflation proceeds and the real value of the currency fluctuates wildly from month to month, all permanent relations between debtors and creditors, which form the ultimate foundation of capitalism, become so utterly disordered as to be almost meaningless; and the process of wealth-getting degenerates into a gamble and a lottery.

Lenin was certainly right. There is no subtler, no surer means of overturning the existing basis of society than to debauch the currency. The process engages all the hidden forces of economic law on the side of destruction, and does it in a manner which not one man in a million is able to diagnose.

== Schools of economic thought ==
Inflationism is most associated with, and a charge most leveled against, schools of economic thought which advocate government action, either fiscal policy or monetary policy, to achieve full employment. Such schools often have heterodox views on monetary economics

The early 19th century Birmingham School of economics, which advocated expansionary monetary policy to achieve full employment, was attacked as "crude inflationists".

The contemporary Post-Keynesian monetary economic school of Neo-Chartalism, which advocates government deficit spending to yield full employment, is attacked as inflationist, with critics arguing that such deficit spending inevitably leads to hyperinflation. Neo-Chartalists reject this charge, such as in the title of the Neo-Chartalist organization the Center for Full Employment and Price Stability.

Neoclassical economics has often argued a deflationist policy; during the Great Depression, many mainstream economists argued that nominal wages should fall, as they had in 19th century economic crises, thus returning prices and employment to equilibrium. This was opposed by Keynesian economics, which argued that a general cut in wages reduced demand, worsening the crisis, without improving employment.

== Contemporary advocacy ==
While few, if any, economists argue that inflation is a good thing in itself, some argue for a generally higher level of inflation, either in general or in the context of economic crises, and deflation is widely agreed to be very harmful.

Three contemporary arguments for higher inflation, the first two from the mainstream school of Keynesian economics and advocated by prominent economists, the latter from the heterodox school of Post-Keynesian economics, are:

- added flexibility in monetary policy;
- wage stickiness; and
- decreasing real burden of debt.

=== Added flexibility in monetary policy ===
A high inflation rate with a low nominal interest rate result in a negative real interest rate; for example, a nominal interest rate of 1% and an inflation rate of 4% yields a real interest rate of approximately −3%. (Note: Properly, the real interest rate in this case is $1.01/1.04 - 1 \approx -2.88\%,$ but the linear approximation $1\%-4\%=-3\%$ is widely used; see Fisher equation for details.) As lower (real) interest rates are associated with stimulating the economy under monetary policy, the higher inflation is, the more flexibility a central bank has in setting (nominal) interest rates while still keeping them nonnegative; negative (nominal) interest rates are considered unconventional monetary policy and have very rarely been practiced.

Olivier Blanchard, chief economist of the International Monetary Fund, argues that the inflation rates during The Great Moderation were too low, causing constraints in the late-2000s recession, and that central banks should consider a target inflation rate of 4% instead of 2%.

=== Wage stickiness ===
Inflation decreases the real value of wages, in the absence of corresponding wage rises. In the theory of wage stickiness, a cause of unemployment in recessions and depressions is the failure of workers to take pay cuts, to decrease real labor costs. It is observed that wages are nominally sticky downwards, even in the long term (it is difficult to reduce nominal pay rates), and thus that inflation provides useful erosion of real costs wages without requiring nominal wage cuts.

Collective bargaining in the Netherlands and Japan has at times yielded nominal wage cuts, in the belief that high real labor costs were causing unemployment.

=== Decreasing real burden of debt ===
In the theory of debt-deflation, a key cause of economic crises is a high level of debt, and a key cause of recovery from crises is when this debt level has decreased. Other than repayment (paying down debt) and default (not paying it), a key mechanism of debt reduction is inflation – because debts are generally in nominal terms, inflation reduces the real level of debt. This effect is more pronounced the higher the debt level. For example, if the debt to GDP ratio of a country is 300% and it experiences one year of 10% inflation, the debt level will be reduced by approximately $300\% \times 10\% = 30\%,$ to 270%. By contrast, if the debt to GDP ratio is 20%, then one year of 10% inflation will reduce the debt level by 2%, to 18%. Thus several years of sustained high inflation significantly reduce a high level of initial debt. This is argued by Steve Keen, among others.

In this context, the direct result of inflation is a transfer of wealth from creditors to debtors – the creditors receive less in real terms than they would have before, while the debtors pay less, assuming that the debts would in fact have been repaid, and not defaulted on. Formally, this is a de facto debt restructuring, with reduction of the real value of principal, and may benefit creditors if it results in the debts being serviced (paid in part), rather than defaulted on.

A related argument is by chartalists, who argue that nations who issue debt denominated in their own fiat currency need never default, because they can print money to pay off the debt. Chartalists note, however, that printing money without matching it with taxation (to recover money and prevent the money supply from growing) can result in inflation if pursued beyond the point of full employment, and Chartalists generally do not argue for inflation.

== See also ==
- Asset price inflation
- Chronic inflation
- Inflation hedge
- Debt monetization or deficit financing
- Monetary inflation
- Statism
- Neo-Chartalism
