= Monetary inflation =

Sustained increase in a state's money supply (not prices)

Monetary inflation is a sustained increase in the money supply of a country (or currency area). Depending on many factors, including public expectations, the state and development of the economy, and the transmission mechanism, a sustained increase in the money supply is likely to result in price inflation, a rise in the general level of prices of goods and services, which is usually just called "inflation".

There is general agreement among economists that there is a causal relationship between monetary inflation and price inflation. But there is neither a common view about the exact theoretical mechanisms and relationships, nor about how to accurately measure it. This relationship is also constantly changing, within a larger complex economic system. So there is a great deal of debate on the issues involved, such as how to measure the monetary base and price inflation, how to measure the effect of public expectations, and how much factors like the velocity of money affect the relationship. Thus, there are different views on what could be the best targets and tools in monetary policy.

However, there is a general consensus on the importance and responsibility of central banks and monetary authorities in setting public expectations of price inflation and in trying to control it.

- Keynesian economists believe the central bank can sufficiently assess the detailed economic variables and circumstances in real time to adjust monetary policy to stabilize gross domestic product. These economists favor monetary policies that attempt to even out the ups and downs of business cycles and economic shocks in a precise fashion.
- Followers of the monetarist school think that Keynesian style monetary policies produce many overshooting, time-lag errors and other unwanted effects, usually making things even worse. They doubt the central bank's capacity to analyse economic problems in real time and its ability to influence the economy with correct timing and the right monetary policy measures. So monetarists advocate a less intrusive and less complex monetary policy, specifically a constant growth rate of the money supply.
- Some followers of Austrian School economics see monetary inflation as "inflation" and advocate either the return to free markets in money, called free banking, or a 100% gold standard and the abolition of central banks to control this problem.

Currently, most central banks follow a monetarist or Keynesian approach, or more often a mix of both. There is a trend of central banks towards the use of inflation targeting.

== Quantity theory ==
The monetarist explanation of inflation operates through the Quantity Theory of Money, $MV = PT$ where M is the money supply, V is the velocity of circulation, P is the price level and T is total transactions or output. As monetarists assume that V and T are determined, in the long run, by real variables, such as the productive capacity of the economy, there is a direct relationship between the growth of the money supply and inflation.

The mechanisms by which excess money might be translated into inflation are examined below. Individuals can also spend their excess money balances directly on goods and services. This has a direct impact on inflation by raising aggregate demand. Also, the increase in the demand for labour resulting from higher demands for goods and services will cause a rise in money wages and unit labour costs. The more inelastic the aggregate supply in the economy, the greater the impact on inflation.

The increase in demand for goods and services may cause a rise in imports. Although this leakage from the domestic economy reduces the money supply, it also increases the supply of money on the international markets thus applying downward pressure on the exchange rate. This may cause imported inflation.

== Modern Monetary Theory ==
Modern Monetary Theory, like all derivatives of the Chartalist school, emphasizes that in nations with monetary sovereignty, a country is always able to repay debts that are denominated in its own currency. However, under modern-day monetary systems, the supply of money is largely determined endogenously. But exogenous factors like government surpluses and deficits play a role and allow government to set inflation targets. Yet, adherents of this school note that monetary inflation and price inflation are distinct, and that when there is idle capacity, monetary inflation can cause a boost in aggregate demand which can, up to a point, offset price inflation.

== Austrian view ==
The Austrian School maintains that inflation is any increase of the money supply (i.e. units of currency or means of exchange) that is not matched by an increase in demand for money, or as Ludwig von Mises put it:

In theoretical investigation there is only one meaning that can rationally be attached to the expression Inflation: an increase in the quantity of money (in the broader sense of the term, so as to include fiduciary media as well), that is not offset by a corresponding increase in the need for money (again in the broader sense of the term), so that a fall in the objective exchange-value of money must occur.

Given that all major economies currently have a central bank supporting the private banking system, money can be supplied into these economies by means of bank credit (or debt). Austrian economists believe that credit growth propagates business cycles (see Austrian Business Cycle Theory).

== See also ==
- Inflationism
