= Modern Monetary Theory =

Macroeconomic theory

Modern Monetary Theory or Modern Money Theory (MMT) is a non-mainstream macroeconomic theory concerning the role of fiscal and monetary policy in sovereign governments that borrow and issue government debt in their own currency.

MMT has been described as a heterodox theory. It departs from mainstream economic consensus by rejecting the conventional model of central bank independence. MMT argues that responsibility for achieving full employment while maintaining price stability should rest with the elected government, with the central bank limited to accommodating the government's fiscal needs.

In MMT, public expenditure is financed through money creation, with no intention of later refinancing it through taxes. MMT proponents acknowledge that money-financed spending is sustainable only while the economy has spare capacity, such as unemployed workers and underused production facilities. Once full capacity is reached, further money creation will generate inflation, which the government should counter by raising taxes to reduce private consumption and investment.

In addition to its macroeconomic policy proposals, MMT includes a theory of money often associated with neo-chartalism, principles based on national income accounting, and labour market proposals such as a job guarantee.

MMT synthesizes ideas from the state theory of money of Georg Friedrich Knapp (also known as chartalism) and the credit theory of money of Alfred Mitchell-Innes, the functional finance proposals of Abba Lerner, Hyman Minsky's views on the banking system and Wynne Godley's sectoral balances approach.

MMT is opposed to the mainstream neoclassical macroeconomic frameworks and has been criticized by many mainstream economists. In a 2019 survey of top U.S. economists not a single respondent agreed with the basic aspects of MMT. MMT has also been rejected by many economists from otherwise divergent schools of thought, including Keynesian and Austrian economists.

== Tenets ==
MMT's main tenets are that a government that issues its own fiat money:

1. Creates money with any and all government spending
2. Effectively destroys money via taxation
3. Cannot be forced to default on debt denominated in its own currency
4. Is limited politically in its money creation only by demand-pull inflation, which accelerates once the real resources (labour, capital and natural resources) of the economy are utilised at full employment
5. Should strengthen automatic stabilisers to control demand-pull inflation, rather than relying upon discretionary tax changes
6. Has the option to issue bonds as a monetary policy device or savings device for the private sector. Bonds cannot act as a means of funding public spending. The government can set whatever price for bonds it decides.
7. Uses taxation to provide the fiscal space to spend without causing inflation and also to drive demand for the currency.

MMT frames government spending and taxation differently to most orthodox frameworks. MMT states that the government is the monopoly issuer of its currency and therefore must spend currency into existence before any tax revenue can be collected. The government spends currency into existence and taxpayers use that currency to pay their obligations to the state.

MMT argues that the primary risk once the economy reaches full employment is demand-pull inflation, which acts as the only constraint on spending. MMT also argues that inflation pressures can be mitigated by increasing taxes on everyone, to reduce the spending capacity of the private sector, releasing real resources such that the state can employ them at current prices in a non-inflationary way.^{:150}

The primary demand and inflation management approach advocated by most MMT economists is the job guarantee employer of last resort (ELR) programme. This provides a spend-side automatic fiscal stabilisation mechanism and establishes a nominal price anchor, utilising a buffer stock of employed labour. This is in contrast to the orthodox monetary dominance approach to demand management which involves adjusting interest rates and utilising a pool of unemployed labour as a buffer against inflationary pressures following a belief in a Phillip's curve trade off between the two.

== Comparison with mainstream economics ==
Françoise Drumetz and Christian Pfister (Bank of France) summarise the main differences between MMT and mainstream macroeconomics in the table below.

Topic	Modern Monetary Theory (MMT)	Mainstream economics
Government expenditure is financed by	money creation	taxation
Public debt sustainability	not a constraint	potentially a constraint
Public bonds are issued	for income redistribution and interest rate management	to cover budget deficits
Access of government to central bank financing	without limits	is limited
Public debt purchased by the central bank	effectively cancelled	remains to be repaid
Crowding out	does not occur	may occur
Monetary policy	no stabilising function	stabilising instrument
Interest rates	determined by the government	determined by markets
Inflation	fiscal in nature	monetary in nature
Unemployment	fully eliminable	not fully eliminable
Conventional structural policies	viewed as harmful	viewed as beneficial
A sovereign economy	does not have to be competitive	should be competitive
Skills	are loosely linked to income	are key determinants of income
Social welfare	costless	involves costs

== History ==
MMT synthesizes ideas from the state theory of money of Georg Friedrich Knapp (also known as chartalism) and the credit theory of money of Alfred Mitchell-Innes, the functional finance proposals of Abba Lerner, Hyman Minsky's views on the banking system and Wynne Godley's sectoral balances approach.

Knapp wrote in 1905 that "money is a creature of law", rather than a commodity. Knapp contrasted his state theory of money with the Gold Standard view of "metallism", where the value of a unit of currency depends on the quantity of precious metal it contains or for which it may be exchanged. He said that the state can create pure paper money and make it exchangeable by recognizing it as legal tender, with the criterion for the money of a state being "that which is accepted at the public pay offices".

The prevailing view of money was that it had evolved from systems of barter to become a medium of exchange because it represented a durable commodity which had some use value, but proponents of MMT such as Randall Wray and Mathew Forstater said that more general statements appearing to support a chartalist view of tax-driven paper money appear in the earlier writings of many classical economists, including Adam Smith, Jean-Baptiste Say, J. S. Mill, Karl Marx, and William Stanley Jevons.

Alfred Mitchell-Innes wrote in 1914 that money exists not as a medium of exchange but as a standard of deferred payment, with government money being debt the government may reclaim through taxation. Innes said:

Whenever a tax is imposed, each taxpayer becomes responsible for the redemption of a small part of the debt which the government has contracted by its issues of money, whether coins, certificates, notes, drafts on the treasury, or by whatever name this money is called. He has to acquire his portion of the debt from some holder of a coin or certificate or other form of government money, and present it to the Treasury in liquidation of his legal debt. He has to redeem or cancel that portion of the debt ... The redemption of government debt by taxation is the basic law of coinage and of any issue of government 'money' in whatever form.

— Alfred Mitchell-Innes, "The Credit Theory of Money", The Banking Law Journal

Knapp and "chartalism" are referenced by John Maynard Keynes in the opening pages of his 1930 Treatise on Money and appear to have influenced Keynesian ideas on the role of the state in the economy.

By 1947, when Abba Lerner wrote his article "Money as a Creature of the State", economists had largely abandoned the idea that the value of money was closely linked to gold. Lerner said that responsibility for avoiding inflation and depressions lay with the state because of its ability to create or tax away money.

Later influences included Hyman Minsky’s chartalist approach to money creation (1986), Basil Moore’s distinction between bank money and state money (1988), and Wynne Godley’s 1996 sectoral balances framework, which MMT draws from.

Economists Warren Mosler, L. Randall Wray, Stephanie Kelton, Bill Mitchell and Pavlina R. Tcherneva are largely responsible for reviving the idea of chartalism as an explanation of money creation; Wray refers to this revived formulation as neo-chartalism.

Pavlina R. Tcherneva has developed the first mathematical framework for MMT and has largely focused on developing the idea of the job guarantee.

Bill Mitchell, professor of economics and Director of the Centre of Full Employment and Equity (CoFEE) at the University of Newcastle in Australia, coined the term 'modern monetary theory'. In their 2008 book Full Employment Abandoned, Mitchell and Joan Muysken use the term to explain monetary systems in which national governments have a monopoly on issuing fiat currency and where a floating exchange rate frees monetary policy from the need to protect foreign exchange reserves.

By 2013, MMT had attracted a popular following through academic blogs and other websites.

In 2019, MMT became a major topic of debate after U.S. Representative Alexandria Ocasio-Cortez said in January that the theory should be a larger part of the conversation. In February 2019, Macroeconomics became the first academic textbook based on the theory, published by Bill Mitchell, Randall Wray, and Martin Watts. MMT became increasingly used by chief economists and Wall Street executives for economic forecasts and investment strategies. The theory was also intensely debated by lawmakers in Japan, which was planning to raise taxes after years of deficit spending.

In June 2020, Stephanie Kelton's MMT book The Deficit Myth became a New York Times bestseller.

Krause, Lubik, and Rhodes argue that MMT's increased prominence was facilitated by the macroeconomic environment from the mid-1990s to the late 2010s, including declining real interest rates, low inflation, and the widespread use of quantitative easing. They argue that these conditions gave governments more room to finance larger deficits and created the superficial impression that monetary expansion could finance expenditure without inflationary or debt-market repercussions. According to them, this impression overlooked other factors that kept inflation and interest rates low, including the global financial crisis, globalization, demographic change and high saving rates. They also note that the inflationary impact of quantitative easing was blunted because much of the liquidity remained as excess reserves in banks rather than becoming cash or bank deposits held by consumers.

== Theoretical approach ==
In sovereign financial systems, banks can create money, but these "horizontal" transactions do not increase net financial assets because assets are offset by liabilities. According to MMT advocates, "The balance sheet of the government does not include any domestic monetary instrument on its asset side; it owns no money. All monetary instruments issued by the government are on its liability side and are created and destroyed with spending and taxing or bond offerings." In MMT, "vertical money" enters circulation through government spending. Taxation and its legal tender enable power to discharge debt and establish fiat money as currency, giving it value by creating demand for it in the form of a private tax obligation. In addition, fines, fees, and licenses create demand for the currency. This currency can be issued by the domestic government or by using a foreign, accepted currency. An ongoing tax obligation, in concert with private confidence and acceptance of the currency, underpins the value of the currency. Because the government can issue its own currency at will, MMT maintains that the level of taxation relative to government spending (the government's deficit spending or budget surplus) is in reality a policy tool that regulates inflation and unemployment, and not a means of funding the government's activities by itself. The approach of MMT typically reverses theories of governmental austerity. The policy implications of the two are likewise typically opposed.

=== Vertical transactions ===
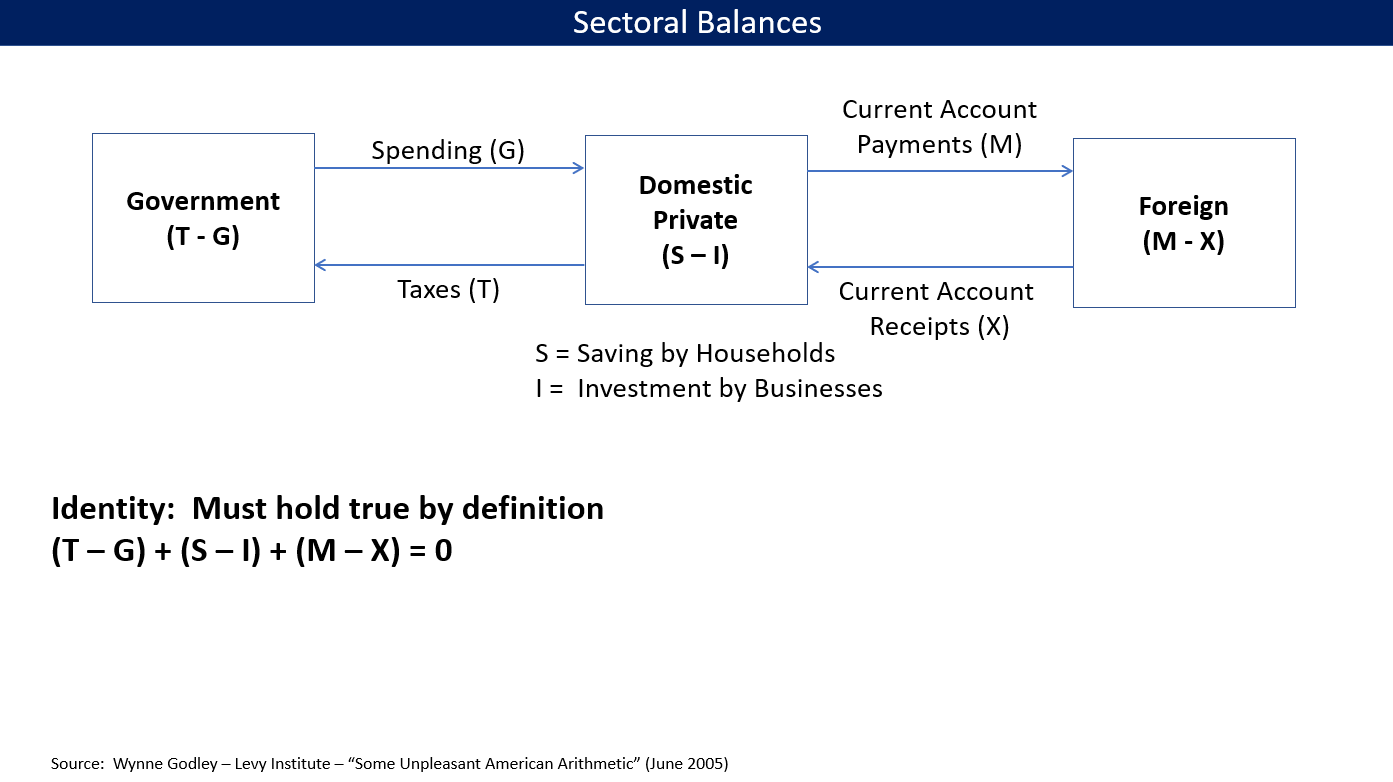
Illustration of the saving identity with the three sectors, the computation of the surplus or deficit balances for each and the flows between them

MMT labels a transaction between a government entity (public sector) and a non-government entity (private sector) as a "vertical transaction". The government sector includes the treasury and central bank. The non-government sector includes domestic and foreign private individuals and firms (including the private banking system) and foreign buyers and sellers of the currency.

=== Interaction between government and the banking sector ===
MMT is based on an account of the "operational realities" of interactions between the government and its central bank, and the commercial banking sector, with proponents like Scott Fullwiler arguing that understanding reserve accounting is critical to understanding monetary policy options.

A sovereign government typically has an operating account with the country's central bank. From this account, the government can spend and also receive taxes and other inflows. Each commercial bank also has an account with the central bank, by means of which it manages its reserves (that is, money for clearing and settling interbank transactions).

When a government spends money, its central bank debits its Treasury's operating account and credits the reserve accounts of the commercial banks. The commercial bank of the final recipient will then credit up this recipient's deposit account by issuing bank money. This spending increases the total reserve deposits in the commercial bank sector. Taxation works in reverse: taxpayers have their bank deposit accounts debited, along with their bank's reserve account being debited to pay the government; thus, deposits in the commercial banking sector fall.

=== Government bonds and interest rate maintenance ===
Virtually all central banks set an interest rate target, and most now establish administered rates to anchor the short-term overnight interest rate at their target. These administered rates include interest paid directly on reserve balances held by commercial banks, a discount rate charged to banks for borrowing reserves directly from the central bank, and an Overnight Reverse Repurchase (ON RRP) facility rate paid to banks for temporarily forgoing reserves in exchange for Treasury securities. The latter facility is a type of open market operation to help ensure interest rates remain at a target level. According to MMT, the issuing of government bonds is best understood as an operation to adjust the composition and maturity of government liabilities held by the non-government sector rather than a requirement to finance government expenditure.

=== Horizontal transactions ===
MMT economists describe any transactions within the private sector as "horizontal" transactions, including the expansion of the broad money supply through the extension of credit by banks.

MMT economists regard the concept of the money multiplier, where a bank is completely constrained in lending through the deposits it holds and its capital requirement, as misleading. Rather than being a practical limitation on lending, the cost of borrowing funds from the interbank market (or the central bank) represents a profitability consideration when the private bank lends in excess of its reserve or capital requirements (see interaction between government and the banking sector). Effects on employment are used as evidence that a currency monopolist is overly restricting the supply of the financial assets needed to pay taxes and satisfy savings desires.

Stephanie Kelton said that bank money is generally accepted in settlement of debt and taxes because of state guarantees, but that state-issued high-powered money sits atop a "hierarchy of money".

== Job guarantee programme ==
MMT economists argue that, in the United States, full employment can be achieved through a federally funded public job creation programme, often described as a job guarantee or Public Service Employment programme. In their view, modern capitalist economies do not reliably generate and maintain full employment, and involuntary unemployment is therefore a recurring feature of such economies. The programme would offer employment to people who want work but are otherwise unemployed, expanding during recessions and contracting when private-sector employment recovers.

According to MMT economists, a Public Service Employment programme would have several advantages. They argue that it would help stabilize both economic activity and household incomes. Because programme spending would rise and fall with the business cycle, the government budget would also respond countercyclically, helping to moderate cyclical fluctuations. MMT proponents further argue that the programme would serve as a wage and price anchor.

Economist Thomas Palley notes that the government job creation programme plays a more central role in MMT than may be immediately apparent, because fiscal policy as envisaged by MMT would face difficulties in fine-tuning the economy. Other critics, such as Buiter and Mann (2019), contend that the success of such a programme would depend on demanding conditions that may not be met in practice. These include the ability of public authorities to maintain a permanent stock of productive and meaningful jobs that can be made available at short notice. They also argue that, if public employment consists of work with little economic value or does not maintain workers’ skills, it may resemble unemployment benefits in another form. Other possible drawbacks include the displacement of private-sector employment if workers prefer better-paid or less demanding public jobs, and inflationary pressure if the programme establishes an effective wage floor for the wider economy.

Economist Malcolm Sawyer identifies four major shortcomings in job guarantee or employer-of-last-resort proposals. First, if the jobs provided are socially useful, they should be organized on a permanent basis according to social need rather than fluctuate with private-sector demand. Second, because such jobs would have to be paid at or below the minimum wage, they could put downward pressure on comparable public-sector wages while still being preferable to insecure or insufficient private-sector employment. Third, the programme could undermine mainstream public employment by encouraging the substitution of regular public jobs with minimum-wage job-guarantee positions. Fourth, the programme would require productive capacity in the right quantities and places to employ people who would otherwise be unemployed, which Sawyer regards as a significant practical constraint.

== International applications and limitations ==
MMT economists recognize that monetary sovereignty exists on a spectrum rather than as a binary condition. In their view, MMT's applicability varies across countries depending on degree of monetary sovereignty, with contrasting implications for the United States versus Eurozone members or countries with currency substitution.

MMT proponents maintain that MMT-style policies are applicable to all countries that issue their own sovereign currency, although they acknowledge that small open economies in the Global South may have less policy space than large, wealthy countries. Randall Wray further argues that smaller or poorer countries with sovereign currencies should rely on flexible exchange rates. Economist Gerald Epstein (2020) disputes the empirical basis for these claims. He contends that the available evidence suggests that many sovereign-currency countries may still be constrained by financial speculation and sudden stops of capital from international capital markets, preventing them from reaching full employment under both fixed and flexible exchange-rate regimes. Epstein concludes that, insofar as MMT applies in practice, its applicability may be largely limited to countries issuing major international currencies.

The United States has especially a broad fiscal and monetary policy space because it issues the dominant international reserve currency, the US dollar. Wray has argued that the dollar's predominance is unlikely to be threatened in the foreseeable future. In contrast, Epstein (2020) argues that key-currency status can erode when credible rivals emerge, identifying China and, to a lesser extent, the eurozone as potential challengers. He further argues that evidence of a move toward a multicurrency system means that dollar holders could more easily switch away from the dollar in response to perceived risks such as exchange-rate instability, high inflation, or default threats, limiting the United States’ ability to rely on the dollar's “exorbitant privilege”.

In a 2024 study, Chunping Liu, Patrick Minford, and Zhirong Ou tested MMT in the case of the United States using a macroeconomic model of post-2008 financial crisis economy. They compared a model based on MMT, in which government deficits can be financed through money creation and inflation is mainly controlled through taxation, with a standard New Keynesian model. Their simulations suggested that the monetary-fiscal policy coordination advocated by MMT economists would bring no improvement in inflation or real interest rate stability, but would substantially destabilize output, undermine overall macroeconomic stability, and reduce household welfare. The authors therefore concluded that MMT does not provide a convincing basis for future economic policy.

== MMT in practice ==
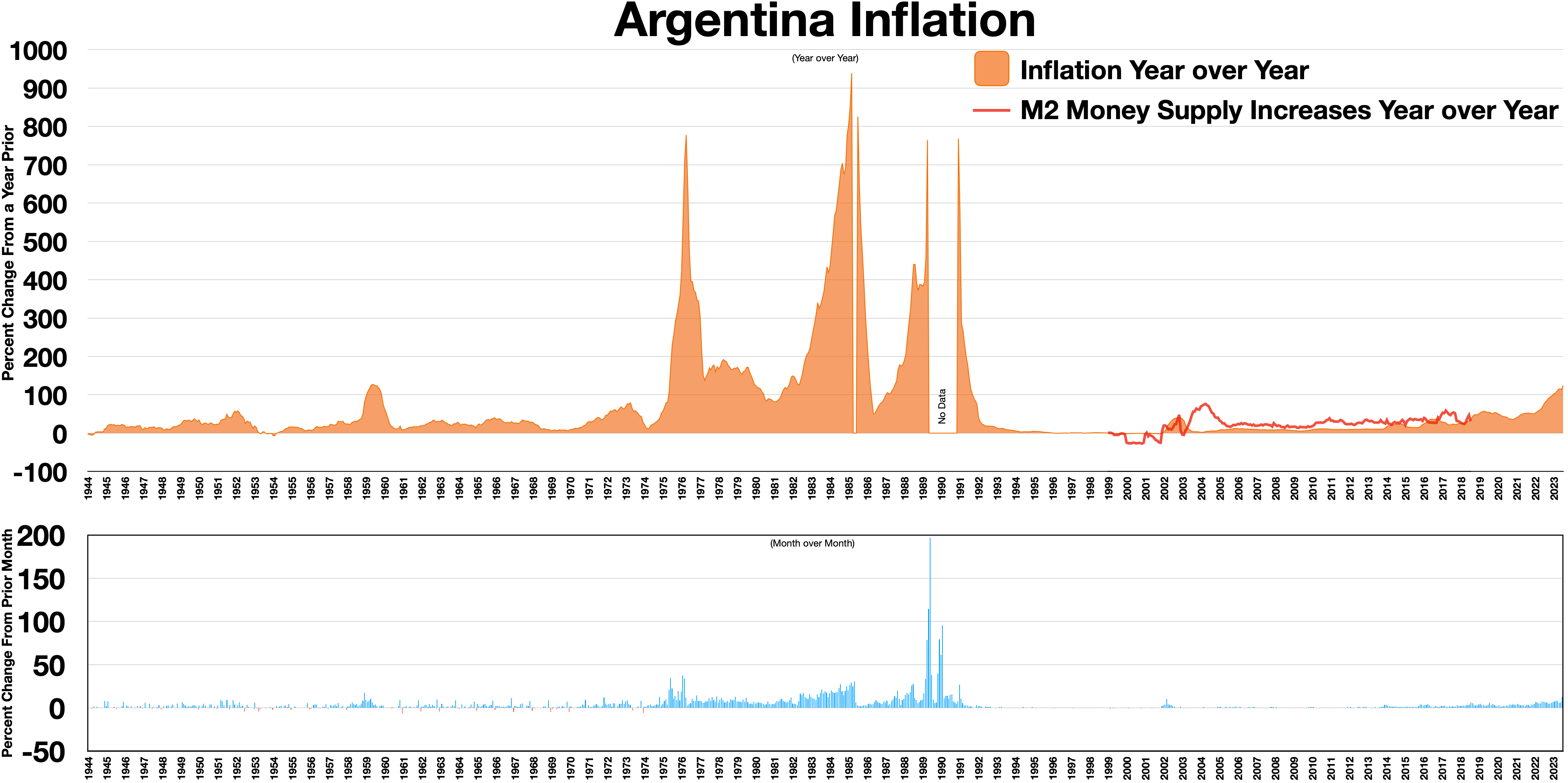
Argentina Inflation Year over Year inflation M2 money supply increases Year over Year Month over Month inflation

According to economist Sebastián Edwards, various cases in Latin America of government spending financed through money creation by the central bank bear similarities to the policy ideas advocated by MMT proponents. These episodes typically unfolded in several stages: first, a brief upturn driven by higher government spending, then the emergence of bottlenecks and imbalances, followed by price controls and exchange rate controls, a loss of confidence in the national currency because consumers abandon the domestic currency. Ultimately the government is replaced, and its successor faces the difficult task of restoring macroeconomic stability. In this context, Edwards discusses Chile (1970–1973), Peru (1985–1990), Argentina (2003–2015) and Venezuela (since 1998), noting that these countries had their own, non-pegged currency, a condition that is also considered important in MMT. According to Edwards, these cases were accompanied by very high inflation (for example 500% in Chile in 1973, 1000% in Venezuela in 2017 and 7000% in Peru in 1990), because the demand for the domestic currency collapsed.

According to economist Emilio Ocampo, writing in 2020, Argentina has, with brief interruptions, pursued policies similar to those associated with MMT since 1946. He argues that countries that consistently adopt such policies are likely to experience high inflation and weak, or even negative, economic growth.

MMT proponent Stephanie Kelton has argued that Japan has been practising MMT for some time. According to economist Sayuri Shirai, this claim is widely regarded in Japan as a misunderstanding of the Bank of Japan’s policy, since large-scale government bond purchases and the maintenance of a yield target around 0% do not in themselves mean that Japan operates under an MMT regime. Kelton's view was also rejected by Prime Minister Shinzo Abe and Bank of Japan Governor Haruhiko Kuroda, who pointed to the government's commitment to restoring fiscal discipline. According to Shirai, labour shortages, population ageing, and persistently low inflation make MMT-style fiscal stimulus difficult to implement in Japan. Shirai argues that Japan has little unused economic capacity remaining because adverse demographic trends have contributed to severe labour shortages. As a result, additional government spending could intensify labour market constraints and crowd out private sector activity. She also argues that a prolonged low-interest-rate environment may weaken productivity growth by sustaining zombie firms and discouraging necessary corporate restructuring.

MMT proponents William Mitchell, Martin Watts, and L. Randall Wray also present Japan as evidence that a country can sustain persistent fiscal deficits and very high public debt, exceeding 200% of GDP, without triggering sharply higher interest rates or higher unemployment. Economist Mark Skousen argues, however, that this interpretation overlooks Japan's weak economic growth since 1992, averaging about 0.9% per year in real terms, which he associates with prolonged large-scale deficit spending.

== Proponents ==
According to post-Keynesian economist Thomas Palley, MMT is associated with a small, overlapping group of economists linked to the University of Missouri–Kansas City and the Levy Economics Institute. Leading MMT advocates include Matthew Forstater, Scott Fullwiler, Stephanie Kelton, Bill Mitchell, Warren Mosler, Richard Murphy, and L. Randall Wray.

According to Carnevali and Fontana, leading proponents of MMT have largely bypassed formal academic engagement with mainstream economists, rarely publishing formal academic papers aimed at persuading or debating with them, and have instead focused on influencing policy-makers and the wider public. They suggest that this strategy reflects the view among MMT scholars that mainstream economists are generally unreceptive to non-mainstream theories and policies and therefore MMT proponents have sought to build support outside academia, with the expectation that pressure from public debate and policy discussion would eventually force mainstream economists to take MMT seriously. Carnevali and Fontana argue that, as a result, much of the debate over MMT has taken place outside conventional scholarly settings, including in newspapers, social media, podcasts, and other forums dominated by non-professional economists.

According to New Keynesian economist Gregory Mankiw, MMT emerged not from prominent academic debates at leading universities, but from a relatively small corner of academia. He argued that it only gained broad public attention after being promoted by high-profile politicians such as Bernie Sanders and Alexandria Ocasio-Cortez, because its tenets aligned with their policy preferences.

== Criticism ==
A 2019 survey of leading economists by the University of Chicago Booth's Initiative on Global Markets showed a unanimous rejection of assertions attributed by the survey to MMT: "Countries that borrow in their own currency should not worry about government deficits because they can always create money to finance their debt" and "Countries that borrow in their own currency can finance as much real government spending as they want by creating money".

According to economist Mark Skousen, MMT is unusual in having drawn criticism from economists across a broad ideological range, from Keynesians to Austrians. He identifies Paul Krugman, Robert Shiller, Kenneth Rogoff, Lawrence Summers, Steve Hanke, and Robert P. Murphy as vocal critics, stating that they regard MMT as a bad and even dangerous policy.

Kasongo Kashama of the National Bank of Belgium argues that one of the strongest objections to assigning macroeconomic stabilisation to elected governments is that they have many incentives to act procyclically. For example, governments may fail to save sufficiently during economic booms because of political agency problems. Elected officials are also subject to political myopia, favouring short-term fiscal expansions that bring immediate political gains while giving less weight to the longer-term inflationary risks of pursuing unrealistic output targets. In addition, if governments and public agencies can finance spending through money creation rather than bond issuance, they may eventually use this seemingly easy source of money for non-productive purposes.

The post-Keynesian economist Thomas Palley has stated that MMT is largely a restatement of elementary Keynesian economics, but prone to "over-simplistic analysis" and understating the risks of its policy implications. Palley has disagreed with proponents of MMT who have asserted that standard Keynesian analysis does not fully capture the accounting identities and financial restraints on a government that can issue its own money. He said that these insights are well captured by standard Keynesian stock-flow consistent IS-LM models, and have been well understood by Keynesian economists for decades. He claimed MMT "assumes away the problem of fiscal–monetary conflict" – that is, that the governmental body that creates the spending budget (e.g. the legislature) may refuse to cooperate with the governmental body that controls the money supply (e.g., the central bank). He stated the policies proposed by MMT proponents would cause serious financial instability in an open economy with flexible exchange rates, while using fixed exchange rates would restore hard financial constraints on the government and "undermines MMT's main claim about sovereign money freeing governments from standard market disciplines and financial constraints". Furthermore, Palley has asserted that MMT lacks a plausible theory of inflation, particularly in the context of full employment in the employer of last resort policy first proposed by Hyman Minsky and advocated by Bill Mitchell and other MMT theorists; of a lack of appreciation of the financial instability that could be caused by permanently zero interest rates; and of overstating the importance of government-created money. Palley concludes that MMT provides no new insights about monetary theory, while making unsubstantiated claims about macroeconomic policy, and that MMT has only received attention recently due to it being a "policy polemic for depressed times".

Paul Krugman, a New Keynesian economist and recipient of the Nobel Prize in Economics, asserted that MMT goes too far in its support for government budget deficits and ignores the inflationary implications of maintaining budget deficits when the economy is growing. Krugman accused MMT devotees as engaging in "calvinball" – a game from the comic strip Calvin and Hobbes in which the players change the rules at whim. Former Chairman of the Council of Economic Advisers and New Keynesian economist N. Gregory Mankiw stated: "my study of MMT led me to find some common ground with its proponents without drawing all the radical inferences they do", but that "put simply, MMT contains some kernels of truth, but its most novel policy prescriptions do not follow cogently from its premises."

Austrian School economist Robert P. Murphy stated that MMT is "dead wrong" and that "the MMT worldview doesn't live up to its promises". He said that MMT saying cutting government deficits erodes private saving is true "only for the portion of private saving that is not invested" and says that the national accounting identities used to explain this aspect of MMT could equally be used to support arguments that government deficits "crowd out" private sector investment.

Marc Lavoie has said that whilst the neochartalist argument is "essentially correct", many of its counter-intuitive claims depend on a "confusing" and "fictitious" consolidation of government and central banking operations, which is what Palley calls "the problem of fiscal–monetary conflict". The chartalist view of money itself, and the MMT emphasis on the importance of taxes in driving money, is also a source of criticism. In 2015, three MMT economists, Scott Fullwiler, Stephanie Kelton, and L. Randall Wray, addressed what they saw as the main criticisms being made.

Freiwirtschaft economist Felix Fuders argues that the growth imperative created by modern monetary theory has harmful environmental, mental, and social consequences. Fuders concluded that it is impossible to meaningfully address the problem of unsustainable growth or fulfill the sustainable development goals proposed by the United Nations without completely overhauling the monetary system in favor of demurrage currency.

== See also ==
- Chartalism
- Ellen Brown
- Everything bubble
- Friedman's k-percent rule – money supply should be increased at a fixed percentage
- Monetary reform
- Debt based monetary system – monetary system where commercial banks create the new money as debt
- Monetary sovereignty
- Money creation
- List of monetary reformers
