= Initiative on Global Markets =

Research center at University of Chicago

The Initiative on Global Markets (IGM) is a research center at the University of Chicago Booth School of Business in the United States. The initiative supports original research on international business, financial markets, and public policy. The IGM is most famous for the weekly polls it conducts of its Economics Experts Panels, consisting of 43 leading economists in the United States panel and 49 such economists in the European panel. (Note: A separate panel, specializing in finance, consists of 40 economists in the US, three of whom are also on the regular US panel.) The IGM also organizes and sponsors conferences.

== History ==
The Initiative on Global Markets was launched with a founding grant (4 years, $1.5 million) from the Chicago Mercantile Exchange Trust (CME Trust), announced December 14, 2006. IGM began its activities in 2007: it co-sponsored (along with the Rosenberg Institute of Global Finance at Brandeis University) the 2007 U.S. monetary policy conference in Washington, D.C., on March 9, 2007.

== IGM polls and the Economics Experts Panel ==
The IGM maintains an Economics Experts Panel (called the IGM Panel for short) comprising leading economists at top United States universities. It circulates poll questions to the IGM Panel and publishes the responses of the IGM Panel members on its website, the IGM Forum.

=== Poll format ===
All IGM poll questions are phrased in the form of a statement, to which participants can choose options from a Likert scale: Strongly Agree, Agree, Uncertain, Disagree, Strongly Disagree. Participants must also indicate a confidence level in their response (on a scale of 10). They may additionally providing a free-form comment to explain their selection.

The poll is conducted over email, with one question sent every week to the IGM Panel members. Candidate poll questions can be submitted by the general public through the website. The final decision on what question to include is made by IGM faculty. Responses of all poll participants (excluding No Opinion responses), along with confidence level and comment, are available on the IGM Forum poll results page, allowing analysts to better understand the reasoning behind the poll responses. In addition, an unweighted and confidence-weighted summary of responses is available.

=== Size and composition of the IGM Panel ===
As of December 2022, the US Economic Experts Panel consists of 43 active economists. The IGM Forum website includes a biography and vote history for each panelist.

According to economist Justin Wolfers, the US panel is geographically and ideologically diverse and are "a good sample of the leading economists in the nation".

Since 2016, IGM has also surveyed a European panel, currently consisting of 49 active economists.

=== Coverage ===
The New York Times has cited the IGM polls on raising the minimum wage, the utility to consumers of allowing services such as Uber and Lyft to compete on equal footing with taxi firms, and the American Recovery and Reinvestment Act.

Forbes has also cited the IGM poll on high-skilled immigration, noting the consensus in favor of immigration.

U.S. News & World Report has cited the IGM poll on tax cuts.

=== Reception ===
The New York Times praised the IGM polls for providing "an easily digested summary of the insights of mainstream economics into continuing political controversies". Nobel Memorial Prize laureate Paul Krugman, writing for The New York Times in January 2013, noted that the IGM polls did not focus on areas that are disputed by macroeconomists.

IGM published a poll entitled "Modern Monetary Theory" in March 2019, in relation to the heterodox macroeconomic theory (MMT) that had been in the news at the time. Bill Mitchell, an MMT scholar, described the poll as "simply a dishonest representation of MMT", stating that he would also "strongly disagree" to both questions being posed, and he argued that the University of Chicago Booth School of Business is probably falling prey to groupthink.

== See also ==
- Economic forecasting
