= David Colander =

American economist (1947–2023)

David C. Colander
- Born: November 16, 1947; Jamestown, New York
- Died: December 4, 2023 (aged 76)

Academic background
- Education: Columbia University
- Doctoral advisor: William Vickrey

Academic work
- Discipline: Macroeconomics
- Institutions: Middlebury College
- Website: Information at IDEAS / RePEc

David Charles Colander (November 16, 1947 – December 4, 2023) was an American economist, and the Christian A. Johnson Distinguished Professor of Economics at Middlebury College. He is known for his study of the economics profession itself and socioeconomics. His books The Making of an Economist and its later edition, The Making of an Economist, Redux, have been called "essential reading for prospective graduate students". He authored over 35 books and 100 articles on a wide variety of subjects. He expressed interest in complexity economics. His latest work focuses on economic education, complexity, and the methodology appropriate to applied policy economics.

Colander received his Ph.D. from Columbia University and taught at Columbia University, Vassar College, the University of Miami, and Princeton University as well as Middlebury College. In 2001–2002 he was the Kelley Professor for Distinguished Teaching at Princeton University. He was president of both the Eastern Economic Association and History of Economic Thought Society and was on the editorial boards of numerous journals, including Journal of Economic Perspectives and the Journal of Economic Education. He was also been a consultant to Time-Life Films, a consultant to Congress, a Brookings Policy Fellow, and a visiting scholar at Nuffield College, Oxford. He is listed in Who's Who?, Who's Who in Education?, etc. in 2017 he received The John R. Commons Award from Omicron Delta Epsilon, the economics honor society.

In an article entitled "Confessions of an Economic Gadfly", Colander relayed the story of his progression as an economist. He states that he was inspired by the "Yeah criterion" – intuitive explanations that seem to fit. He also discussed the influence of mathematics on economics and his career. He said that he was not an "ultramathematician", and was comfortable taking an intuitive approach to economic ideas. Thus he did not favor what he called "the MIT approach" of formalism. He believed that the MIT approach limits one's intuition and recollects encountering colleagues who refused to discuss economic ideas without formal models. Despite Colander's aversion to simplified formal models, he began his career working on a mathematical project. He got his break, however, when he collaborated with Abba P. Lerner on a book. After that, he was able to publish in certain journals. He began to write textbooks, and he later tried to focus his publications in areas where his ideas are less well-known.
