= Wilhelm Launhardt =

German mathematician and economist

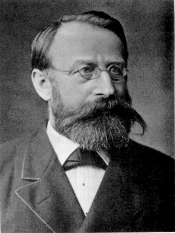
Wilhelm Launhardt

Carl Wilhelm Friedrich Launhardt (7 April 1832 – 14 May 1918) was a German mathematician and economist.

Launhardt was born in Hannover, the capital of the Kingdom of Hannover. He studied and taught at Hannover's technical school. Following Hannover's annexation by the Kingdom of Prussia, Launhardt served in the Prussian House of Lords.

In 1885 he succeeded in calculating the optimal rate of duties in the sense of the effects of the terms of trade.

== Works ==
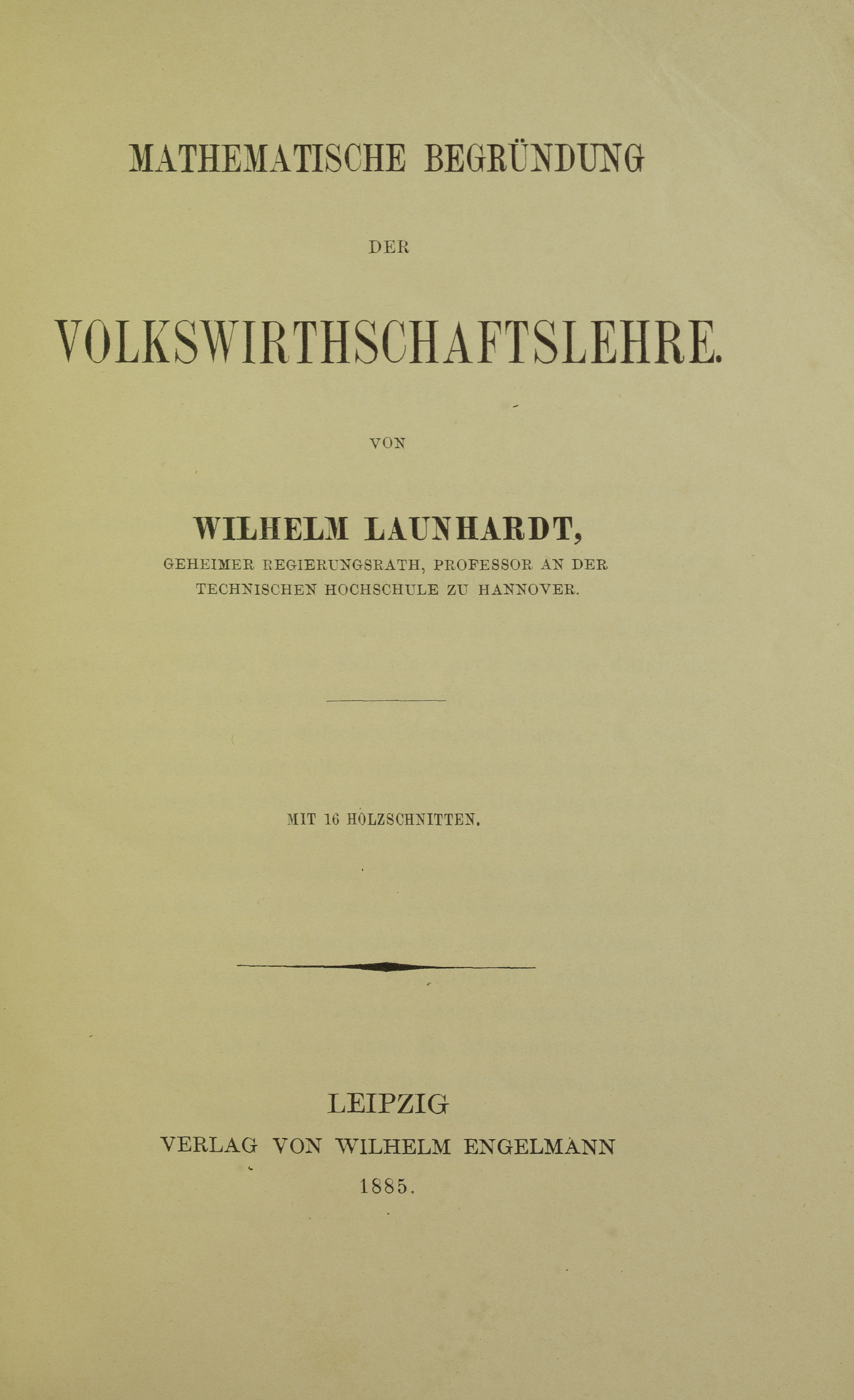
Mathematische Begründung der Volkswirtschaftslehre, 1885

- Wilhelm Launhardt, A. Bewley (1900). The Theory of the Trace. Lawrence Asylum Press. "The Theory of the Trace: Being a discussion of the principles of location,...", 1872
- "Die Bestimmung des Zweckmässigsten Standortes einer Gewerblichen Anlage", Zeitschrift des Vereines Deutscher Ingenieure, 1882. Translated as "Determining the most convenient location for a commercial plant", the magazine of the Association of German Engineers.
- Mathematische Begründung der Volkswirtschaftslehre, 1885. Translated as "Mathematical foundation of economics".
- Theory of Network Planning, 1888.
- Launhardt, Wilhelm (1885). Mathematische Begründung der Volkswirtschaftslehre (in German). Leipzig: Engelmann, Wilhelm.
