= Georg Friedrich Knapp =

German economist

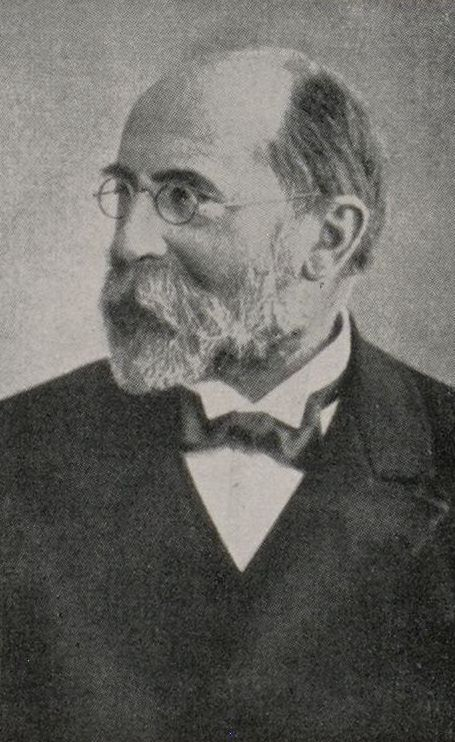
- Georg Friedrich Knapp
- Born: 7 March 1842; Gießen, Grand Duchy of Hesse
- Died: 20 February 1926 (aged 83); Darmstadt, Hesse, Germany

Academic background
- Influences: Ferdinand Lassalle

Academic work
- Discipline: Monetary economics, statistics
- School or tradition: Chartalism, Historical school of economics
- Institutions: University of Strasbourg

Georg Friedrich Knapp (German: [knap]; 7 March 1842 – 20 February 1926) was a German heterodox economist who in 1905 published The State Theory of Money, which founded the chartalist school of monetary economics, which argues that money's value derives from its issuance by an institutional form of government rather than spontaneously through relations of exchange.

== Biography ==
Knapp was born on 7 March 1842. His father was the acclaimed chemist Friedrich Ludwig Knapp. Knapp studied in Munich, Berlin and Göttingen, and in 1867 became director of the Statistical Bureau of Leipzig. In 1869 he was appointed assistant professor of economics and statistics at Leipzig University. In 1874 he was appointed a professor of political economy at the University of Strasbourg, where he remained until 1918. He was also rector at Strasbourg in 1891–1892 and 1907–1908.

In 1886, he founded the periodical Abhandlungen aus dem staatswissenschaftlichen Seminar zu Strassburg.

== Family ==
Knapp was the father of Elly Heuss-Knapp, the future wife of Theodor Heuss, the first President of the Federal Republic of Germany.

He raised his two daughters alone, uncommon at the time, after their Georgian-born mother, Knapp's wife Lydia v. Karganow, became mentally ill.

== The State Theory of Money ==
The State Theory of Money, a 1924 English translation of Staatliche Theorie des Geldes.

Knapp is mostly remembered for this book which was partially translated into English by the Royal Economic Society and published for the first time in the United Kingdom in 1924, nineteen years after its first publication in German.

The State Theory of Money sets about to build a theory which could encompass indifferent monetary systems based on precious metals or paper money. Knapp's approach is naturalistic. As a theorist, he does not want to recommend what the monetary system ought to be, nor does he explore how money could be put to use in order to attain certain goals. Drawing almost entirely on examples set in 19th century Europe, he derives from them a genetic and then a functional classification. In the process, the book reveals that some of what had been previously thought to be 'specie' money, was simply what he calls 'chartal hylogenic money'. An avowed Chartalist, Knapp does not advocate paper money pure and simple, he points out effectively that the Metallists with their theory cannot effectively explain some observed phenomena which they call 'anomalies'. To the contrary, Knapp thinks his theory is able to explain the manifold monetary systems mentioned in the book. Apart from its theoretical insights, the book is particularly interesting in that it is a very detailed source of information on 19th century European monetary history, focusing on the following countries: England, France, Holland, Austria and Germany. Due to a lack of financial means, the Royal Economic Society voluntary omitted the translation of Chapter IV which contains a historical review of England, France, Germany, Austria, and appendices containing specific case studies. All the same, even in its abridged English version The State Theory of Money depicts precisely the many changes which happened during the course of the 19th century: a general move from bimetallism to monometallism, the appearance and disappearance of paper money systems (in particular the Austrian one of 1866), the almost systematic use of paper money by the State in case of war alongside existing means of payment, the emergence of bank-notes and the use of Giro payments etc.

== Reception ==
According to Drumetz and Pfister (2021), the attempt to develop the state theory of money (STM) into a comprehensive theory has been seriously questioned by reviewers. They note that STM does not provide an explanation of the value of money and lacks correspondence with historical evidence.

Drumetz and Pfister (2021) summarize early reviews of the state theory of money (STM) as largely critical and correct. Reviewers argued that STM lacked a sufficient theoretical economic foundation, particularly because it did not address the value or purchasing power of money. Ludwig von Mises (1912) contended that the issue was not that STM was a flawed monetary theory, but that it was “not a monetary theory at all.” Charles Rist (1938) described it as a juridical construction intended to rationalize legal decisions. Joseph Schumpeter (1926) wrote that the theory went wrong when dealing with fundamentally economic questions and later described it as a theory of the legal nature of money rather than of its economic value, suggesting that its influence on German monetary science had been largely unfortunate.

Critics also argued that STM did not adequately correspond to historical evidence and failed to engage seriously with competing approaches, particularly the quantity theory of money. Rist (1938) maintained that the theory contradicted the monetary principles adopted by some states. Voigt (1906) argued that Knapp developed his theory a priori without sufficient empirical grounding. Even sympathetic commentators such as Bonar (1922) questioned whether STM sufficiently accounted for phenomena such as currency zones and dollarisation.

== Publications ==
His earlier writings deal chiefly with population and agricultural topics.

- Knapp, Georg Friedrich (1865). Zur Prüfung der Untersuchungen Thünen's über Lohn und Zinsfuss im isolirten Staate (in German). Braunschweig: Friedrich Vieweg und Sohn.
- Knapp, Georg Friedrich (1868). Über die Ermittlung der Sterblichkeit (in German). Leipzig: J. C. Hinrichs’sche Buchhandlung. ("On the ascertainment of mortality").
- Knapp, Georg Friedrich (1869). Die Sterblichkeit in Sachsen (in German). Leipzig: Duncker & Humblot. ("Mortality in Saxony").
- Knapp, Georg Friedrich (1871). Die neuern Ansichten über Moralstatistik (in German). Jena: Verlag von Friedrich Mauke.
- Knapp, Georg Friedrich (1874). Theorie des Bevölkerungs-Wechsels: Abhandlungen zur angewandten Mathematik (in German). Braunschweig: Verlag von Friedrich Vieweg und Sohn. ("The theory of population fluctuations").
- Knapp, Georg Friedrich (1887). Die Bauern-Befreiung und der Ursprung der Landarbeiter in den älteren Theilen Preußens (in German). Vol. I. Leipzig: Duncker & Humblot. ("The liberation of peasants and the origins of the agriculturalist in the older parts of Prussia").
- Knapp, Georg Friedrich (1887). Die Bauern-Befreiung und der Ursprung der Landarbeiter in den älteren Theilen Preußens (in German). Vol. II. Leipzig: Duncker & Humblot. ("The liberation of peasants and the origins of the agriculturalist in the older parts of Prussia").
- Knapp, Georg Friedrich (1891). Die Landarbeiter in Knechtschaft und Freiheit: vier Vorträge (in German). Leipzig: Duncker & Humblot. ("The farmer in serfdom and freedom").
- Knapp, Georg Friedrich (1905). Staatliche Theorie des Geldes (in German) (1 ed.). Leipzig: Duncker & Humblot.
  - Knapp, Georg Friedrich (1918). Staatliche Theorie des Geldes (in German) (2 ed.). Leipzig: Duncker & Humblot.
  - Knapp, Georg Friedrich (1921). Staatliche Theorie des Geldes (in German) (3 ed.). Leipzig: Duncker & Humblot.
  - Knapp, Georg Friedrich (1923). Staatliche Theorie des Geldes (in German) (4 ed.). Leipzig: Duncker & Humblot.
  - Knapp, Georg Friedrich (1924). Die staatliche Theorie des Geldes [The State Theory of Money] (PDF). Translated by Lucas, H. M.; Bonar, J. London: Macmillian & Company. Translation of the fourth edition.
- Knapp, Georg Friedrich (1897). Grundherrschaft und Rittergut: Vorträge, nebst biographischen Beilagen (in German). Leipzig: Duncker & Humblot. ("Land ownership and seignorial lands").
- Knapp, Georg Friedrich (1925). Einführung in einige Hauptgebiete der Nationalökonomie (in German). Leipzig: Duncker & Humblot.

== Honours ==
- Pour le Mérite for Sciences and Arts (24 January 1918).

== See also ==
- Fiat money vs. commodity money
- Modern monetary theory
- Keynesian economics
