= 2001 United States federal budget =

2001 Budget of the United States federal government
- Submitted: February 7, 2000
- Submitted by: Bill Clinton
- Submitted to: 106th Congress
- Country: United States
- Total revenue: $2.02 trillion (requested) $1.99 trillion (actual); 18.8% of GDP (actual)
- Total expenditures: $1.835 trillion $1.863 trillion (actual); 17.6% of GDP (actual)
- Surplus: $128 billion (actual); 1.2% of GDP (actual)
- Debt: $5.77 trillion (at fiscal end); 54.6% of GDP
- GDP: $10.565 trillion
- Website: Office of Management and Budget

The United States Federal Budget for Fiscal Year 2001, was a spending request by President Bill Clinton to fund government operations for October 2000-September 2001. Figures shown in the spending request do not reflect the actual appropriations for Fiscal Year 2001, which must be authorized by Congress.

== Total Receipts ==
2001 Actual Receipts by Source
1. Individual income tax (49.9%)
2. Social Security/other payroll tax (34.9%)
3. Corporate income tax (7.60%)
4. Excise tax (3.30%)
5. Estate and gift taxes (1.40%)
6. Customs duties (1.00%)
7. Other miscellaneous receipts (1.90%)

(in billions of dollars)

Source	Requested	Actual
Individual income tax	972	994
Corporate income tax	195	151
Social Security and other payroll tax	682	694
Excise tax	77	66
Estate and gift taxes	32	28
Customs duties	21	19
Other miscellaneous receipts	40	38
Total	2,019	1,991

== Total Outlays ==
Outlays by budget function (in millions)

Function	Title	Actual
050	National Defense	$304,732
150	International Affairs	$16,485
250	General Science, Space and Technology	$19,753
270	Energy	$9
300	Natural Resources and Environment	$25,532
350	Agriculture	$26,252
370	Commerce and Housing Credit	$5,731
400	Transportation	$54,447
450	Community and Regional Development	$11,773
500	Education, Training, Employment and Social Services	$57,094
550	Health	$172,233
570	Medicare	$217,384
600	Income Security	$269,774
650	Social Security	$432,958
700	Veterans Benefits and Services	$44,974
750	Administration of Justice	$30,201
800	General Government	$14,358
900	Net Interest	$206,167
920	Allowances	$-
950	Undistributed Offsetting Receipts	$−47,011
	Total	$1,862,846
