= Stephanie Kelton =

American heterodox economist (born 1969)

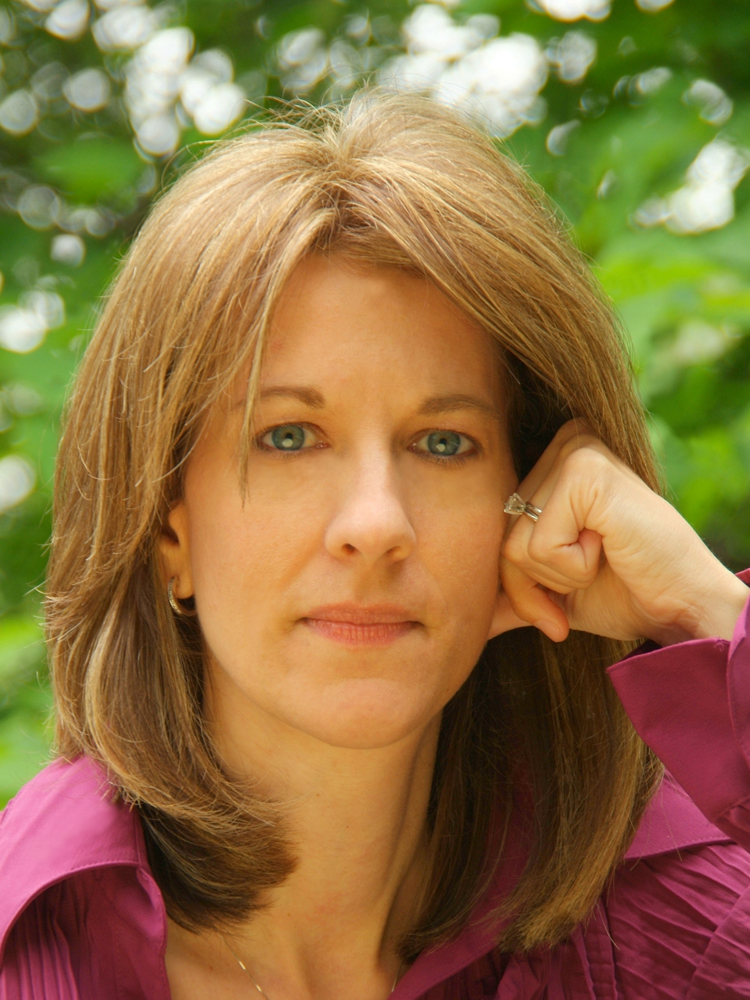
- Born: Stephanie Bell; October 10, 1969 (age 57)

Academic background
- Education: California State University, Sacramento (BA, BS); Christ's College, Cambridge (MPhil); New School (PhD)

Academic work
- School or tradition: Modern monetary theory
- Institutions: Stony Brook University
- Notable ideas: Modern monetary theory

Stephanie A. Kelton (née Bell; born October 10, 1969) is an American heterodox economist and academic, and a leading proponent of modern monetary theory. She served as an advisor to Bernie Sanders's 2016 presidential campaign and worked for the Senate Budget Committee under his chairmanship. She is also the author of The Deficit Myth, a New York Times bestseller, on modern monetary theory.

Kelton is a professor at Stony Brook University and a senior fellow at the Schwartz Center for Economic Policy Analysis at The New School for Social Research. She was formerly a professor at the University of Missouri–Kansas City.

Kelton is also founder and editor-in-chief of the blog New Economic Perspectives. She was named one of Politico's 50 "thinkers, doers, and visionaries transforming American politics in 2016". Fast Company later placed Kelton on its list of most creative people in business. In 2019, she joined the board of Matriarch PAC.

== Family ==
Kelton is the daughter of Jerald and Marlene Bell. She is married to Paul Kelton, and they have two children.

== Education ==
Kelton studied business finance and economics at California State University, Sacramento, and earned a B.S. and a B.A. in 1995. She received a Rotary scholarship to study economics at the University of Cambridge, receiving her Master's degree in 1997. On a fellowship from Christ's College, Cambridge, Kelton then spent a year at the Levy Economics Institute of Bard College. She obtained a Ph.D. in economics from The New School for Social Research in 2001 with her dissertation, "Public Policy and Government Finance: A Comparative Analysis Under Different Monetary Systems".

== Employment ==
Kelton is a professor of public policy and economics at Stony Brook University and was formerly the chair of the economics department at the University of Missouri–Kansas City. She was a research scholar at the UMKC Center for Full Employment and Price Stability and the Levy Economics Institute in upstate New York.

Kelton was editor-in-chief of the New Economic Perspectives blog.

On December 26, 2014, Kelton was designated Chief Economist for the Democratic Minority Staff of the Senate Budget Committee, a post she held in 2015 and early 2016, when she left that position to become an economic advisor to Bernie Sanders's presidential campaign.

On May 25, 2017, Stony Brook University announced that Kelton would join the university "This fall as a professor in the forthcoming Center for the Study of Inequality and Social Justice." She joined Stony Brook at the same time as her husband, Paul, who was appointed the first Robert David Lion Gardiner Chair in American history, at the College of Arts and Sciences.

In 2019, Kelton was invited to be the Geoff Harcourt Visiting professor at the University of Adelaide.

== Research ==
Kelton's primary research interests include monetary theory, employment policy, history of economic monetary thought, social security, public finance, fiscal policy, financial accounting, international finance, and European monetary integration. She has been a notable proponent of and researcher in modern monetary theory, publishing several papers and editing books in the field, and a supporter of the proposal for a job guarantee.

== In the media ==
Kelton publishes formally as well as in the popular press and appears on mass media. She has been a frequent guest on television and radio, including MSNBC's Up with Chris Hayes and NPR's On Point. Kelton has had opinion pieces published in The Los Angeles Times and The New York Times. "How We Think About the Deficit Is Mostly Wrong" appeared in The New York Times. Kelton wrote the article "Congress can give every American a pony (if it breeds enough ponies)", which appeared in The Los Angeles Times.

== The Deficit Myth: Modern Monetary Theory and the Birth of the People's Economy ==
Kelton's The Deficit Myth appeared on The New York Times bestseller list for nonfiction in June 2020. "It is an introduction to Modern Monetary Theory (MMT), an economic school of thought that is growing in popularity. It seeks to explain why for countries with monetary sovereignty the federal budget is fundamentally different from a household budget, and why deficits are generally good for the economy. Instead of focusing on self-imposed budget constraints, Kelton suggests we should use inflation and real resource limits as the measuring stick for public spending."

Former Yale University economics professor and Under Secretary of State for Economic Affairs Richard N. Cooper called The Deficit Myth a "clear and vigorously written book" in a review for Foreign Affairs, and wrote that "U.S. congressional fiscal action in response to the pandemic, as well as new programs launched by the Federal Reserve, suggests that the author is at least partly right in her assessment of the spending power of governments."

Nichols College economics professor Hans G. Despain called the book a "triumph" in the London School of Economics Review of Books, writing that the book "dispels six key myths that have shaped the conventional understanding of deficits as inherently bad, instead arguing that deficits can strengthen economies and lead to faster growth.

In the Review of Political Economy, David M. Fields credited Kelton with "lucid prose and a razor-sharp wit" and called the book a "wonderful contribution to the project of building a critical and progressive social science".

Stanford University economist John H. Cochrane gave the book a negative review, saying that Kelton's "implications don't lead to her desired conclusions ... her logic, facts and language turn into pretzels". Cochrane called Kelton's analysis of inflation biased, and said the book cited "no articles in major peer-reviewed journals, monographs with explicit models and evidence, or any of the other trappings of economic discourse".

New York University economist Alberto Bisin also panned the book, writing, "it's not that the public-spending agenda proposed in the book wouldn't be worthwhile, or that monetization is never a useful tool of monetary policy. ... These are all issues currently studied and debated in (mainstream) academic and policy circles. But MMT, as exposed in the book, appears to be a very poor attempt at supporting this political agenda, with no coherent theoretical support."

Former European Central Bank chief economist Otmar Issing gave the book a negative review in an article criticizing modern monetary theory.

== Selected works ==
- Bell (Kelton), Stephanie, "Can Taxes and Bonds Finance Government Spending?", Levy Economics Institute, July 1998
- Bell (Kelton), Stephanie, "The role of the state and the hierarchy of money ", Cambridge Journal of Economics, Vol. 25, 2001, pp. 149–163
- Kelton, Stephanie, Edward J. Nell, editors. The State, the Market, and the Euro: Metallism versus Chartalism in the Theory of Money; Edward Elgar Publishing; Reprint edition: May 2003; ISBN 9781843761563
- Kelton, Stephanie, The Deficit Myth: Modern Monetary Theory and the Birth of the People's Economy, PublicAffairs; June 2020; ISBN 9781541736184

== See also ==
- History of economic thought
- Post-Keynesian economics
- Heterodox economics
