= Economic expansion =

Upturn in economic activity

An economic expansion is an upturn in the level of economic activity and of the goods and services available. It is a finite period of growth, often measured by a rise in real GDP, that marks a reversal from a previous period, for example, while recovering from a recession. The explanation of fluctuations in aggregate economic activity between expansions and contractions ("booms" and "busts" within the "business cycle") is one of the primary concerns of macroeconomics.

== Definition ==
According to the four stages of a business cycle (expansion, peak, contraction, trough), an expansion is an upward trend when a country's economy experiences relatively rapid growth as measured by a rise in industrial production, employment, consumer spending, and utilization of resources. Whereas a recession is defined as two consecutive quarters of decline in GDP, economic recovery and prosperity are two successive phases of expansion.

Economic expansion can be affected by external factors such as technological changes or weather conditions, or by internal factors such as a country's fiscal policy, monetary policy, regulatory policy, interest rates, the availability of credit, or other impacts on producer incentives. Global events, such as pandemics, may also influence the amount of economic activity in various countries.

Economic expansion and contraction refer to the overall output of all goods and services, while the terms "inflation" and "deflation" refer to rising and falling prices of commodities, goods and services in relation to the value of money.

From a microeconomic standpoint, expansion usually means enlarging the scale of a single company or firm. This can be achieved through internal actions—opening branches, finding new customers, inventing products, developing lines of business—and through integration, for example, taking over or merging with other companies.
