= Alfred Mitchell-Innes =

British diplomat, economist and author (1864-1950)

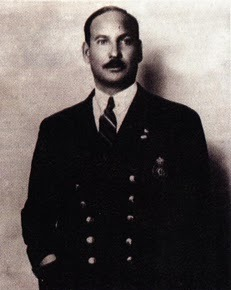

1st President of Al Ahly SC
- In office 24 April 1907 – 2 April 1908
- Succeeded by: Aziz Ezzat Pasha

Personal details
- Born: 30 June 1864; Edinburgh
- Died: 13 February 1950 (aged 85); Bedford, Bedfordshire

Alfred Mitchell-Innes (30 June 1864 – 13 February 1950) was a British diplomat, economist and author. He had the Grand Cross of the Order of Medjidieh conferred upon him by Abbas II, Khedive of Egypt. He served as the first president of the Egyptian and the Africa's most crowned club Al Ahly SC, from 1907 to 1908.

== Early and personal life ==
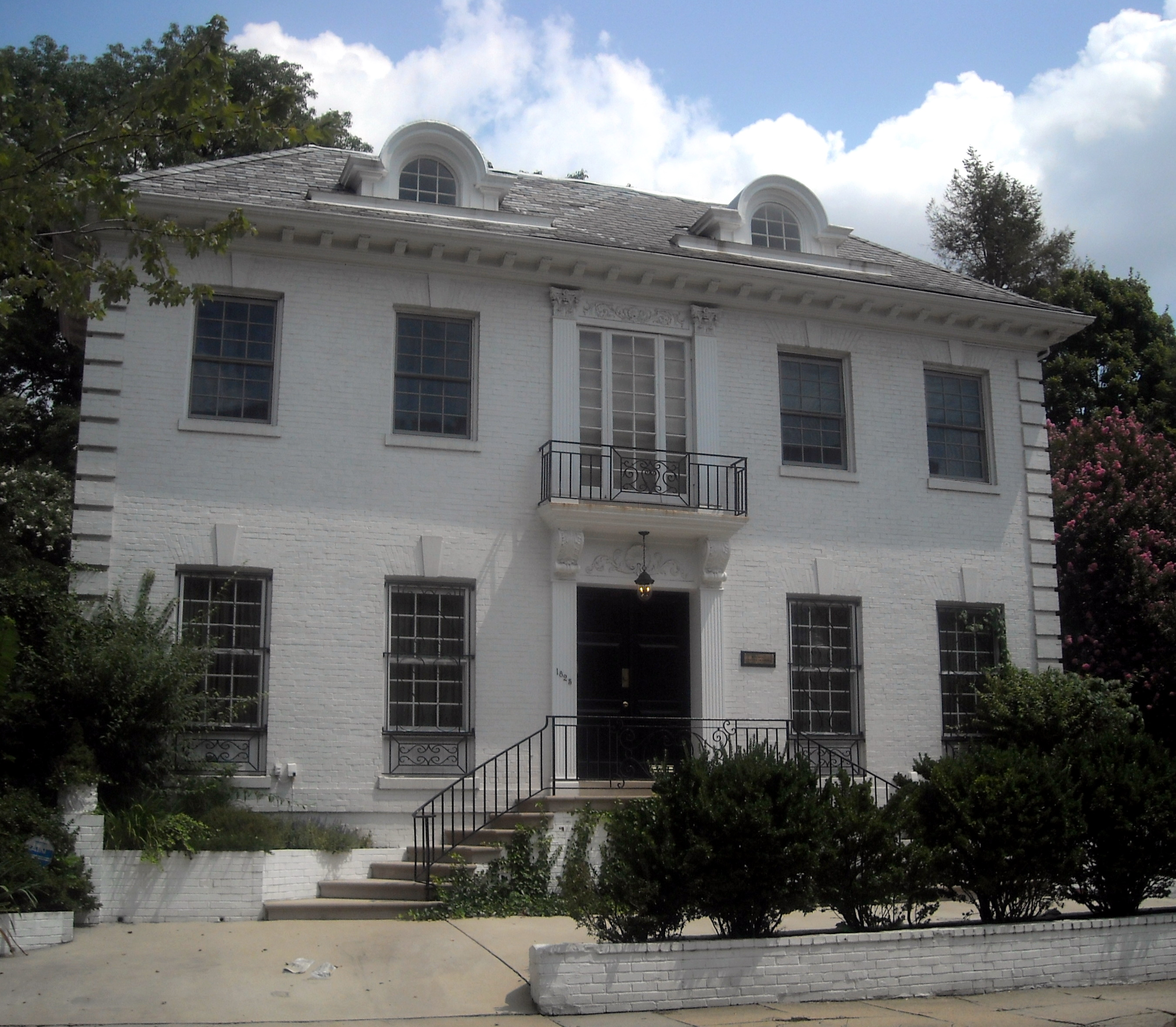
Former residence of Alfred Mitchell-Innes in Washington, D.C.

The youngest child of Alexander Mitchell-Innes (1811–1886) of Ayton, and Whitehall (near Chirnside), Berwickshire, by his second spouse Fanny Augusta (1821–1902), daughter of James Vine, in Puckaster, Isle of Wight, Alfred was born at 2 Forres Street, Edinburgh. He married (her second marriage) in 1919, Eveline (d. 28 December 1946), daughter of Sir William Miller, 1st Baronet of Manderston, Berwickshire. In 1934, Mitchell-Innes and his wife contributed 25 Egyptian and oriental antiquities he had acquired from Egypt to the British Museum.

== Career ==
Educated privately, he entered the British Diplomatic Service in 1890 and was appointed to Cairo the next year. In 1896 he became financial advisor to Chulalongkorn the Great (Rama V), King of Siam. In 1899, he was appointed Under-Secretary of State for Finance in Egypt, where he founded Al Ahly SC on 24 April 1907.

He later worked as a Counselor at the British Embassy in Washington, D.C. from 1908 to 1913. He was Minister to Uruguay from 1913 to 1919, after which he retired.

While in Washington, he wrote two articles on money and credit for The Banking Law Journal. The first, 'What is Money?', received an approving review from John Maynard Keynes, which led to the publication of the second, 'Credit theory of money'. Long forgotten and rediscovered decades later, the articles have been praised as "the best pair of articles on the nature of money written in the twentieth century".

In retirement he joined Bedford Town Council, serving twice: from 1921 to 1931 and from 1934 to 1947.

== Publications ==
- Mitchell-Innes, Alfred (January 1913). "Love and The Law: a study of Oriental justice". Hibbert Journal. London: George Allen & Unwin: 273–296. OCLC 79467367.
- — (May 1913). "What is Money?". The Banking Law Journal: 377–408. OCLC 81811554.
- — (January–December 1914). "The Credit Theory of Money". The Banking Law Journal. 31: 151–168.
- — (1932). Martyrdom in our Times: Two essays on prisons and punishments. London: Williams & Norgate.
- — (25 March 2004). Wray, L. Randall (ed.). Credit and State Theories of Money: The Contributions of A. Mitchell Innes. Cheltenham, UK: Edward Elgar. ISBN 9781843765134.
