= Abba P. Lerner =

Russian-British economist (1903–1982)

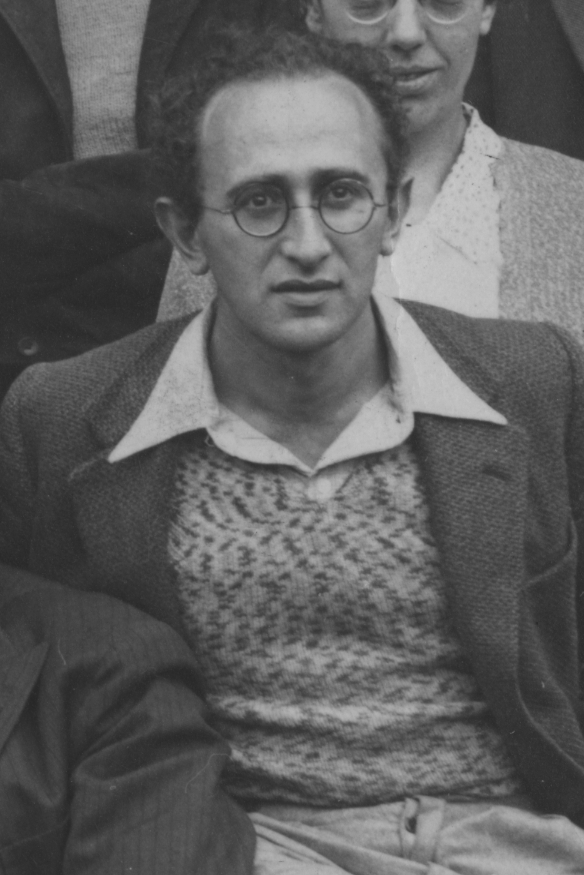
- Lerner in 1938
- Born: Abraham Ptachya Lerner; 28 October 1903; Novoselytsia, Bukovina, Austria-Hungary
- Died: 27 October 1982 (aged 78); Tallahassee, Florida, United States

Academic background
- Education: London School of Economics
- Influences: Friedrich Hayek, John Maynard Keynes, Paul Samuelson, Oskar R. Lange

Academic work
- Discipline: Economics
- School or tradition: Post-Keynesian economics

Abraham "Abba" Ptachya Lerner (also Abba Psachia Lerner; 28 October 1903 – 27 October 1982) was a Russian-born American-British heterodox economist. He was nicknamed the "left-wing Milton Friedman" by Tibor Scitovsky and Paul Samuelson.

== Biography ==
Born in Novoselytsia, Bukovina, then part of the Austro-Hungarian Empire Lerner grew up in an Ashkenazi Jewish family, which emigrated to Great Britain when Lerner was three years old. Lerner grew up in London's East End and from age 16 worked as a machinist, a teacher in Hebrew schools, and as an entrepreneur. In 1929, Lerner entered the London School of Economics, where he studied under Friedrich Hayek. A six-month stay at Cambridge in 1934–1935 brought him into contact with John Maynard Keynes. In 1937, Lerner emigrated to the United States. While in the US, he befriended intellectual opponents Milton Friedman and Barry Goldwater.

Lerner never stayed at one institution long, serving on the faculties of nearly a dozen universities and accepting over 20 visiting appointments. Lerner was 62 when he was given a professorship at the University of California, Berkeley in 1965 and left after reaching mandatory retirement age six years later. During his time there, Lerner criticized the unrest caused by the student protests as a threat to academic freedom.

Abba Lerner taught in the Economics Department at Florida State University, for several years. He stopped teaching after he suffered a stroke while visiting Israel.

Although Lerner never received the Sveriges Riksbank's Nobel Memorial Prize in Economic Sciences, he has been recognized as one of the greatest economists of his era.

== Research ==
- Lerner developed a model of market socialism which featured decentralised market pricing proportional to marginal social cost and in so doing contributed to the Lange–Lerner–Taylor theorem.
- Lerner contributed to the idea of a social dividend by incorporating it into Oskar R. Lange's original model of socialism, where the social dividend would be distributed to each citizen as a lump-sum payment.
- The use of fiscal policy and monetary policy as the twin tools of Keynesian economics is credited to Lerner by historians such as David Colander.
- The Lerner symmetry theorem states that an import tariff can have the same effects as an export tax.
- The Lerner index measures potential monopoly power as mark-up of price over marginal cost divided by price or equivalently the negative inverse of demand elasticity.
- Lerner improved a formula of Alfred Marshall, which is known since as the Marshall–Lerner condition.
- Lerner improved the calculations made by Wilhelm Launhardt on the effect of terms of trade.
- Lerner developed the concept of distributive efficiency, which argued that economic equality will produce the greatest probable total utility with a given amount of wealth.
- Based on effective demand and chartalism, Lerner developed functional finance, a theory of purposeful financing and funding to meet explicit goals, including full employment. This is in contrast to "sound finance" principles where taxation is designed solely to fund expenditure or finance investment and low inflation.
- The Lerner–Samuelson theorem goes back to Lerner.
