= Chartalism =

Heterodox theory of money

Chartalism is a heterodox theory in macroeconomics that views money as a pure creation of the state, introduced to control and organize economic activity rather than arising from barter or debt. It holds that fiat currency has value because governments impose taxes that must be paid in the currency they issue, creating demand for it.

== Background ==
Georg Friedrich Knapp, a German economist, invented the term "chartalism" in his State Theory of Money, which was published in German in 1905 and translated into English in 1924. The name derives from the Latin charta, in the sense of a token or ticket. Knapp argued that "money is a creature of law" rather than a commodity. Knapp contrasted his state theory of money with "metallism", as embodied at the time in the gold standard, where the value of a unit of currency depended on the quantity of precious metal it contained or could be exchanged for. He argued the state could create pure paper money and make it exchangeable by recognising it as legal tender, with the criterion for the money of a state being "that which is accepted at the public pay offices".

When Knapp was writing, the prevailing view of money was that it had evolved from systems of barter to become a medium of exchange because it represented a durable commodity which had some use value. However, modern chartalist economists Randall Wray and Mathew Forstater say that chartalist insights into tax-driven paper money can be found in the earlier writings of many classical economists, for instance Adam Smith, who observed in The Wealth of Nations:

A prince, who should enact that a certain proportion of his taxes should be paid in a paper money of a certain kind, might thereby give a certain value to this paper money; even though the term of its final discharge and redemption should depend altogether on the will of the prince.

— Adam Smith, An Inquiry into the Nature and Causes of the Wealth of Nations

Forstater also finds support for the concept of tax-driven money, under certain institutional conditions, in the work of Jean-Baptiste Say, John Stuart Mill, Karl Marx and William Stanley Jevons.

Alfred Mitchell-Innes, writing in 1914, argued that money existed not as a medium of exchange but as a standard of deferred payment, with government money being debt the government could reclaim by taxation. Innes argued:

Whenever a tax is imposed, each taxpayer becomes responsible for the redemption of a small part of the debt which the government has contracted by its issues of money, whether coins, certificates, notes, drafts on the treasury, or by whatever name this money is called. He has to acquire his portion of the debt from some holder of a coin or certificate or other form of government money, and present it to the Treasury in liquidation of his legal debt. He has to redeem or cancel that portion of the debt...The redemption of government debt by taxation is the basic law of coinage and of any issue of government ‘money’ in whatever form.

— Alfred Mitchell-Innes, The Credit Theory of Money, The Banking Law Journal

Knapp and "Chartalism" were referenced by John Maynard Keynes in the opening pages of his 1930 Treatise on Money and appear to have influenced Keynesian ideas on the role of the state in the economy. By 1947, when Abba Lerner wrote his article "Money as a Creature of the State", economists had largely abandoned the idea that the value of money was closely linked to gold. Lerner argued that responsibility for avoiding inflation and depressions lay with the state because of its ability to create or tax away money.

Historian Constantina Katsari sees principles from both metallism and chartalism reflected in the monetary system introduced by Augustus to the eastern provinces of the Roman Empire, from the early 1st century to the late 3rd century AD.

== Modern proponents ==
Economists Warren Mosler, L. Randall Wray, Stephanie Kelton, and Bill Mitchell are largely responsible for reviving chartalism as an explanation of money creation; Wray refers to this revived formulation as Neo-Chartalism.

Mitchell, founder of the Centre of Full Employment and Equity or CofFEE at the University of Newcastle in Australia, coined the term Modern Monetary Theory to describe modern Neo-Chartalism, and that term is now widely used. Scott Fullwiler has added detailed technical analysis of the banking and monetary systems.

Hyman Minsky seemed to incorporate a Chartalist approach to money creation in his 1986 book Stabilizing an Unstable Economy, while Basil Moore, in his 1988 book Horizontalists and Verticalists, delineates the differences between bank money and state money.

James K. Galbraith supports chartalism and wrote the foreword for Mosler's book Seven Deadly Innocent Frauds of Economic Policy in 2010.

== See also ==
- Fiat currency
- Functional finance
- Demand for money
- History of money
- History of macroeconomic thought
- Heterodox economics
- Monetary sovereignty
