= L. Randall Wray =

American economist associated with Modern Monetary Theory

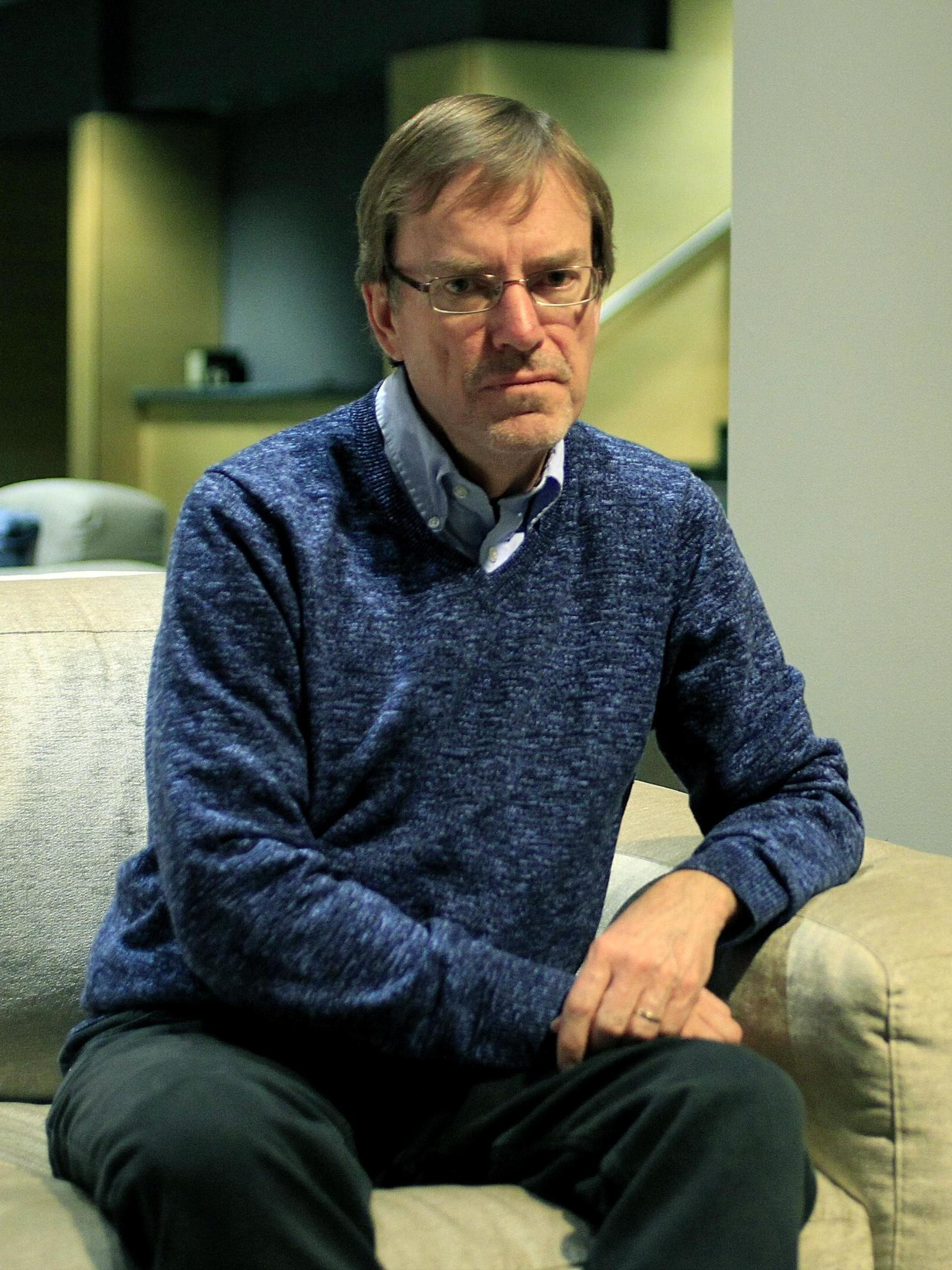
- Born: June 19, 1953 (age 73)

Academic background
- Education: University of the Pacific (BA); Washington University (MA, PhD)
- Influences: Hyman Minsky

Academic work
- Discipline: Monetary economics; political economy
- School or tradition: Post-Keynesian economics, Modern Monetary Theory
- Institutions: University of Missouri–Kansas City
- Website: Information at IDEAS / RePEc

Larry Randall Wray (born June 19, 1953) is a professor of Economics at Bard College and Senior Scholar at the Levy Economics Institute. Previously, he was a professor at the University of Missouri–Kansas City in Kansas City, Missouri, USA, whose faculty he joined in August 1999, and a professor at the University of Denver, where he served from 1987 to 1999. He has served as a visiting professor at the University of Rome, Italy, the University of Paris, France, and the UNAM, in Mexico City. From 1994 to 1995 he was a Fulbright Scholar at the University of Bologna. From 2015 he is a visiting professor at the University of Bergamo, located in Italy. He was a visiting professor at Masaryk University in the Czech Republic.

Wray is a past president of the Association for Institutional Thought and served on the board of directors of the Association for Evolutionary Economics. He has served, along with fellow post-Keynesian William Mitchell of the Charles Darwin University, Australia, as co-editor of the International Journal of Environment, Workplace, and Employment.

== Views ==
In a 2011 New York Times article he accused Standard & Poor of "attempt[ing] to influence the political debate in Washington" concerning government debt by downgrading US debt from stable to negative.

L. Randall Wray has been a long-time proponent of Modern monetary theory (MMT) and has written and spoken about the subject extensively.

Wray and his fellow MMT advocates have gained at least some acceptance among people working on Wall Street.

== Education ==
Wray received a B.A. from the University of the Pacific and an M.A. and Ph.D. from Washington University in St. Louis. He came to economics relatively late in his academic career after studying psychology as an undergraduate.

== Speeches and Lectures ==
On April 6, 2018, Wray gave a lecture at St. Francis College, located in New York City, about Modern Monetary Theory. In this lecture he takes the viewer through the history of MMT and then lists the main benefits of the theory.

On November 20, 2019, Wray gave Congressional testimony, which he called the "Reexamining the Economics of Costs of Debt".

== Publications ==
A student of Hyman P. Minsky while at Washington University in St. Louis, Wray has focused on monetary theory and policy, macroeconomics, financial instability, and employment policy.

Wray has published widely in journals and is the author of Understanding Modern Money: The Key to Full Employment and Price Stability (Elgar 1998) and Money and Credit in Capitalist Economies (Elgar 1990). He is the editor of Credit and State Theories of Money (Elgar 2004) and the co-editor of Contemporary Post-Keynesian Analysis (Elgar 2005), Money, Financial Instability and Stabilization Policy (Elgar 2006), and Keynes for the twenty-first century: The Continuing Relevance of The General Theory (Palgrave 2008). He coauthored Macroeconomics (Macmillan 2019), with William Mitchell and Martin Watts.

Wray is also the author of numerous scholarly articles in edited books and academic journals, including the Journal of Economic Issues, the Cambridge Journal of Economics, the Review of Political Economy, the Journal of Post Keynesian Economics, the Economic and Labour Relations Review, the French journal Economie Appliquée, and the Eastern Economic Journal.

== Legal issues ==
In May 2026, Wray was charged by Red Hook Police in New York with misdemeanor driving while intoxicated following a two-vehicle crash near Bard College.

== See also ==
- Modern Monetary Theory
- Chartalism
- Post-Keynesian economics
- Heterodox economics
- Fiat money vs. commodity money
- Government accounting
