= Functional finance =

Economic theory

Functional finance or Functional Finance Theory (FFT) is an economic theory proposed by Abba P. Lerner, based on effective demand principles and chartalism. It states that government should finance itself to meet explicit goals, such as taming the business cycle, achieving full employment, ensuring growth, and low inflation.

== Principles ==
The principal ideas behind functional finance can be summarized as:

- Governments have to intervene in the national and global economy; these economies are not self-regulating.
- The principal economic objective of the state should be to ensure a prosperous economy.
- Money is a creature of the state; it has to be managed.
- Fiscal policy should be directed in light of its impact on the economy, and the budget should be managed accordingly, that is, 'balancing revenue and spending' is not important; prosperity is important.
- The amount and pace of government spending should be set in light of the desired level of activity, and taxes should be levied for their economic impact, rather than to raise revenue.
- Principles of 'sound finance' apply to individuals. They make sense for individuals, households, businesses, and non-sovereign governments (such as cities and individual US states) but do not apply to the governments of sovereign states, capable of issuing money.

== Rules for fiscal policy ==
Lerner postulated that government's fiscal policy should be governed by three rules:

1. The government shall maintain a reasonable level of demand at all times. If there is too little spending and, thus, excessive unemployment, the government shall reduce taxes or increase its own spending. If there is too much spending, the government shall prevent inflation by reducing its own expenditures or by increasing taxes.
2. By borrowing money when it wishes to raise the rate of interest and by lending money or repaying debt when it wishes to lower the rate of interest, the government shall maintain that rate of interest that induces the optimum amount of investment.
3. If either of the first two rules conflicts with principles of 'sound finance' or of balancing the budget, or of limiting the national debt, so much the worse for these principles. The government press shall print any money that may be needed to carry out rules 1 and 2.

== Limits ==
Lerner concedes that Functional Finance Theory (FFT) would not hold if a country's public debt were owned abroad or issued in a foreign currency. In such cases, the debt level would impose a real constraint, since the government could not create money to repay it. He argues that FFT applies only to countries that are able to borrow long term in their own currency.

== Criticism ==
From a contemporary perspective, Paul Krugman (2019) argues that Lerner overlooked the trade-off between monetary and fiscal policy. Under Functional Finance Theory (FFT), the interest rate should be set to achieve a desired level of investment, after which fiscal policy would ensure full employment. However, FFT offers no clear criterion for determining the optimal interest rate. Krugman also notes that FFT fails to consider the technical and political constraints on raising taxes or cutting spending. If public debt becomes unsustainable (for example, when the interest rate exceeds the growth rate) governments may be forced to run large primary surpluses, which can be politically difficult. In such situations, financial repression, debt restructuring, or igniting inflation may become tempting options, as illustrated by Argentina.

Following rising inflation in the mid-1960s, even heterodox economists abandoned FFT. The theory re-emerged in the late 1990s with the development of Modern Monetary Theory. Lerner later acknowledged that FFT had focused too narrowly on the macroeconomic level, neglecting institutional constraints, microeconomic analysis, and the risk of stagflation.

== See also ==
- Government success
- Government failure
- Market failure
- Modern Monetary Theory
