= Financial capital =

Economic resources used to buy what is needed to make products or provide services

Financial capital (also simply known as capital or equity in finance, accounting and economics) is any economic resource measured in terms of money used by entrepreneurs and businesses to buy what they need to make their products or to provide their services to the sector of the economy upon which their operation is based (e.g. retail, corporate, investment banking). In other words, financial capital is internal retained earnings generated by the entity or funds provided by lenders (and investors) to businesses in order to purchase real capital equipment or services for producing new goods or services.

In contrast, real capital comprises physical goods that assist in the production of other goods and services (e.g. shovels for gravediggers, sewing machines for tailors, or machinery and tooling for factories).

== IFRS concepts of capital maintenance ==
Financial capital generally refers to saved-up financial wealth, especially that used in order to start or maintain a business. A financial concept of capital is adopted by most entities in preparing their financial reports. Under a financial concept of capital, such as invested money or invested purchasing power, capital is synonymous with the net assets or equity of the entity. Under a physical concept of capital, such as operating capability, capital is regarded as the productive capacity of the entity based on, for example, units of output per day.

Financial capital maintenance can be measured in either nominal monetary units or units of constant purchasing power. Accordingly, there are three concepts of capital maintenance in terms of International Financial Reporting Standards (IFRS):

1. Physical capital maintenance;
2. Financial capital maintenance in nominal monetary units; and
3. Financial capital maintenance in units of constant purchasing power.

Financial capital is provided by lenders for a price: interest. Also see time value of money for a more detailed description of how financial capital may be analyzed. Furthermore, financial capital, is any liquid medium or mechanism that represents wealth, or other styles of capital. It is, however, usually purchasing power in the form of money available for the production or purchasing of goods, etcetera. Capital can also be obtained by producing more than what is immediately required and saving the surplus.

Financial capital can also be in the form of purchasable items such as computers or books that can contribute directly or indirectly to obtaining various other types of capital. Financial capital has been subcategorized by some academics as economic or "productive capital" necessary for operations, signaling capital which signals a company's financial strength to shareholders, and regulatory capital which fulfills capital requirements.

== Sources of capital ==
- Long term – usually above 7 years
  - Share Capital
  - Mortgage loan
  - Retained Profit
  - Venture capital
  - Debenture
  - Project finance
- Medium term – usually between 2 and 7 years
  - Term Loans
  - Revenue-based financing
  - Leasing
  - Hire Purchase
- Short term – usually under 2 years
  - Bank Overdraft
  - Trade credit
  - Deferred Expenses
  - Factoring

=== Capital market ===
- Long-term funds are bought and sold:
  - Shares
  - Debenture
  - Long-term loans, often with a mortgage bond as security
  - Reserve funds
  - Euro Bonds

=== Money market ===
- Financial institutions can use short-term savings to lend out in the form of short-term loans:
  - Commercial paper
  - Credit on open account
  - Bank overdraft
  - Short-term loans
  - Bills of exchange
  - Factoring of debtors

== Differences between shares and debentures ==
- Shareholders are effectively owners; debenture-holders are creditors.
- Shareholders may vote at AGMs (Annual General Meetings, alternatively Annual Shareholder Meetings) and be elected as directors; debenture-holders may not vote at AGMs or be elected as directors.
- Shareholders receive profit in the form of dividends; debenture-holders receive a fixed rate of interest.
- If there is no profit, the shareholder does not receive a dividend; interest is paid to debenture-holders regardless of whether or not a profit has been made.
- In case of dissolution the firm's debenture holders are paid first, before shareholders.

== Types of capital ==
=== Fixed capital ===
Fixed capital is money firms use to purchase assets that will remain permanently in the business and help it make a profit. Factors determining fixed capital requirements:

- Nature of business
- Size of business
- Stage of development
- Capital invested by the owners
- location of that area

=== Working capital ===
Firms use working capital to run their business. For example, money that they use to buy stock, pay expenses and finance credit. Factors determining working capital requirements:

- Size of business
- Stage of development
- Time of production
- Rate of stock turnover ratio
- Buying and selling terms
- Seasonal consumption
- Seasonal product
- profit level
- growth and expansion
- production cycle
- general nature of business
- business cycle
- business policies
- Debt ratio

=== Own and borrowed capital ===
Capital contributed by the owner or entrepreneur of a business, and obtained, for example, by means of savings or inheritance, is known as own capital or equity, whereas that which is granted by another person or institution via debt instruments is called borrowed capital, and this must usually be paid back with interest. The ratio between debt and equity is named leverage. It has to be optimized as a high leverage can bring a higher profit but create solvency risk.

Borrowed capital is capital that the business borrows from institutions or people, and includes debentures:

- Redeemable debentures
- Irredeemable debentures
- Debentures to bearer
- Ordinary debentures
- bonds
- deposits
- loans

Own capital is private capital that owners of a business (shareholders and partners, for example) provide, sometimes called owners equity. The ownership interest is typically represented in preferred shares, and may be of various types, for example:

- Preference shares/hybrid source of finance
  - Ordinary preference shares
  - Cumulative preference shares
  - Participating preference shares
- Ordinary shares
- Bonus shares
- Founders' shares

These typically have preference over the common shares. This means the payments made to the shareholders are first paid to the preference shareholder(s) and then to the equity shareholders.

== Instruments ==
A contract regarding any combination of capital assets is called a financial instrument, and may serve as a

- medium of exchange,
- standard of deferred payment,
- unit of account, or
- store of value.

Most indigenous forms of money (wampum, shells, tally sticks and such) and the modern fiat money are only a "symbolic" storage of value and not a real storage of value like commodity money.

=== Valuation ===
Normally, a financial instrument is priced accordingly to the perception by capital market players of its expected return and risk. Unit of account functions may come into question if valuations of complex financial instruments vary drastically based on timing. The "book value", "mark-to-market" and "mark-to-future" conventions are three different approaches to reconciling financial capital value units of account.

== Issuing and trading ==
Like money, financial instruments may be "backed" by state military fiat, credit (i.e. social capital held by banks and their depositors), or precious metals resources. Governments generally closely control the supply of it and usually require some "reserve" be held by institutions granting credit. Trading between various national currency instruments is conducted on a money market. Such trading reveals differences in probability of debt collection or store of value function of that currency, as assigned by traders.

When in forms other than money, financial capital may be traded on bond markets or reinsurance markets with varying degrees of trust in the social capital (not just credits) of bond-issuers, insurers, and others who issue and trade in financial instruments. When payment is deferred on any such instrument, typically an interest rate is higher than the standard interest rates paid by banks, or charged by the central bank on its money. Often such instruments are called fixed-income instruments if they have reliable payment schedules associated with the uniform rate of interest. A variable-rate instrument, such as many consumer mortgages, will reflect the standard rate for deferred payment set by the central bank prime rate, increasing it by some fixed percentage. Other instruments, such as citizen entitlements, e.g. "U.S. Social Security", or other pensions, may be indexed to the rate of inflation, to provide a reliable value stream.

Typically commodity markets depend on politics that affect international trade, e.g. boycotts and embargoes, or factors that influence natural capital, e.g. weather that affects food crops. Meanwhile, stock markets are more influenced by trust in corporate leaders, i.e. individual capital, by consumers, i.e. social capital or "brand capital" (in some analyses), and internal organizational efficiency, i.e. instructional capital and infrastructural capital. Some enterprises issue instruments to specifically track one limited division or brand. "Financial futures", "Short selling" and "financial options" apply to these markets, and are typically pure financial bets on outcomes, rather than being a direct representation of any underlying asset.

== Broadening the notion ==
The relationship between financial capital, money, and all other styles of capital, especially human capital or labor, is assumed in central bank policy and regulations regarding instruments as above. Such relationships and policies are characterized by a political economy – feudalist, socialist, capitalist, green, anarchist or otherwise. In effect, the means of money supply and other regulations on financial capital represent the economic sense of the value system of the society itself, as they determine the allocation of labor in that society.

So, for instance, rules for increasing or reducing the money supply based on perceived inflation, or on measuring well-being, reflect some such values, reflect the importance of using (all forms of) financial capital as a stable store of value. If this is very important, inflation control is key - any amount of money inflation reduces the value of financial capital with respect to all other types.

If, however, the medium of exchange function is more critical, new money may be more freely issued regardless of impact on either inflation or well-being.

== Economic role ==
Socialism, capitalism, feudalism, anarchism, and other civic theories take markedly different views of the role of financial capital in social life, and propose various political restrictions to deal with that.

Financial capitalism is the production of profit from the manipulation of financial capital. It is held in contrast to industrial capitalism, where profit is made from the manufacture of goods.

=== Marxist perspectives ===
It is common in Marxist theory to refer to the role of finance capital as the determining and ruling class interest in capitalist society, particularly in the latter stages.

== See also ==
- Capital market
- Constant item purchasing power accounting
- Financial risk management
- Financialization
- Funding
- Money supply
- List of finance topics

== Sources ==
- Difference between Shares and Debentures
