= Maryland Tobacco Inspection Act of 1747 =

Act to improve the quality of tobacco production and exports

The Maryland Tobacco Inspection Act of 1747 was enacted in the colony of Maryland with the aim of improving the general quality of tobacco production and exports. Since tobacco was so widely used as commodity money, the act affected currency as well as the structure of tobacco farming and export. As the primary export and revenue source for Maryland, tobacco played a vital role in the economy. The Tobacco Inspection Act of 1747 guaranteed that a specified quality would be met, with the intention of increasing demand for Maryland Tobacco and hence increasing its price, and overall revenue.

== Background ==
Earlier attempts of Maryland's Government to stimulate stagnating prices for Maryland Tobacco came in the form of legislated reduction in output. By reducing the output of tobacco produced, the equilibrium price for tobacco would be driven up, counteracting the otherwise stagnating prices. These policies, however, turned out to be so unpopular that the government of Maryland had trouble enforcing them. After a similar inspection law in Virginia in the 1730s, however, Maryland witnessed the benefits of such a policy. Maryland tobacco farmers were able to observe the rising revenues for Virginian tobacco farmers, which had a devastating effect on the Maryland tobacco industry. Also, because tobacco notes were used so widely as commodity money, it was necessary to ensure the quality of the tobacco to validate the reliability of the notes.

== Impact on local economies ==
The first and most significant effect on the local economy was the impact the inspection act had on prices. From 1720 to 1747 tobacco prices stagnated, however, prices rose dramatically after 1747, closing the gap on the price for Virginian tobacco. Another significant effect the law had was to diversify the local economy. Because the act set a minimum level of quality for tobacco, growers who could not meet this minimum quality level were driven to other crops, namely the production of foodstuffs such as grains and livestock. This led to a consolidation of tobacco farmers into a specialized group of producers, decreasing distribution costs in the tobacco trade.

Regarding the effect on local currency, the Tobacco Inspection Act served to further legitimize the use of tobacco notes as commodity money. Because the quality of the tobacco backing the notes was now guaranteed, the notes were accepted more readily and in a broader circulation base. This is because there was a decrease in the uncertainty associated with a stranger's tobacco, increasing the number of transactions in which the tobacco notes could be used. The result of this was to increase the velocity of money, subsequently increasing the money supply. Also, the revaluation of tobacco led to a one-time redistribution of wealth from most debtors to creditors, since they were being repaid in more valuable currency, and a long term redistribution of income from tenants to landlords.

== Overall effects ==
Overall there were many positive effects of the Maryland Tobacco Inspection Act of 1747. The act without a doubt contributed to the economic growth of Maryland Likewise, revenue from tobacco production rose sharply, and the industry in general benefited from an increase in specialization. One factor in this was the development of the inspection warehouse system, which reduced transportation costs of the tobacco trade. Also, those producers of tobacco who were too large or small, too far from rivers for transportation, or did not have optimal lands for tobacco production were forced out of the industry because of the rising costs associated with more stringent inspection. On the whole, the law encouraged diversification, increased productivity, and created long run benefits for the economic performance of Maryland.
