= Made beaver =

Unit of account used in the Hudson's Bay Company

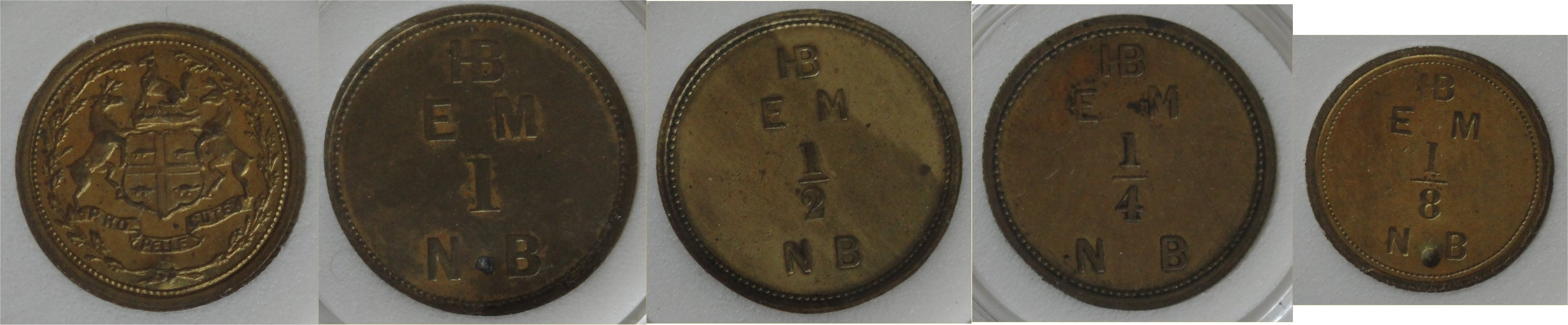
Hudson's Bay Company issued tokens equivalent to a single beaver skin, or fraction thereof. The tokens depicted were used circa 1854.

The made beaver was a unit of account used in the Hudson's Bay Company (HBC), located in British North America. One male beaver skin collected during winter months was equivalent to one made beaver.

== History ==
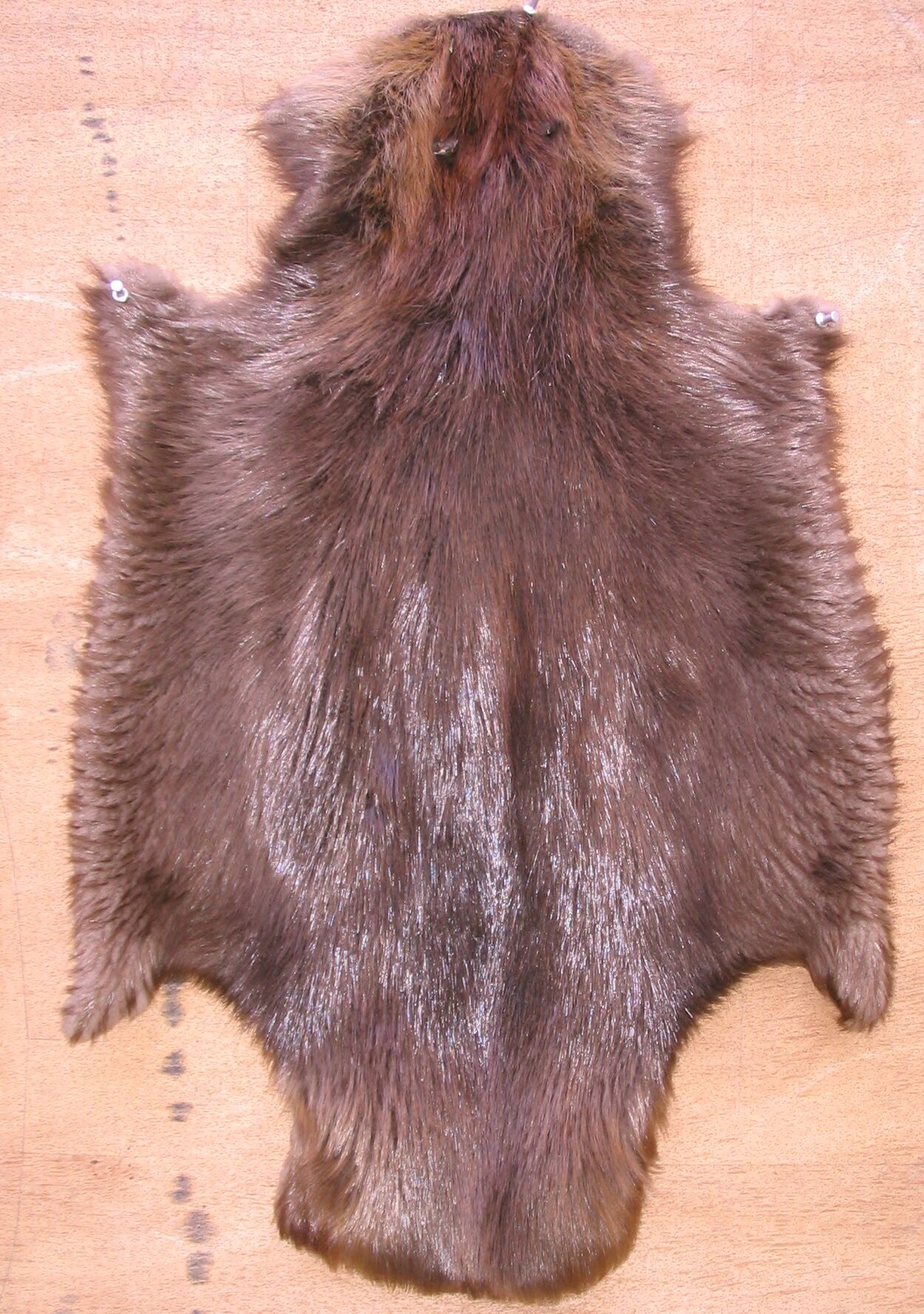
A beaver skin

Throughout the 17th century, European fishermen and First Nations engaged in the fur trade. These fishermen would not trade directly with hunters. Rather, they would trade goods with First Nation middlemen. Prior to the HBC's formation, French settlers and Indigenous traders exchanged goods for furs near the Ottawa and St. Lawrence Rivers.

In 1670, England chartered the HBC. At that time, the company set up a number of trading posts, and by 1718, it had a monopoly on all trade in the basin of Hudson Bay.

The British did not use a standardized currency for over 250 years after settling in Canada. During that time, most trade was carried out through the practice of bartering. Eventually, traders began using various foreign coins as stores of value. In order to trade with Indigenous peoples, the HBC standardized the unit of account as the made beaver, or one high quality beaver skin.

In 1795, a made beaver could buy eight knives, one kettle, or a gun could be purchased with 10 made beaver pelts.

== Mechanism of exchange ==
Each HBC trading post exchanged made beavers and various other goods.

In addition to exchanging physical beaver skins, the post managers also exchanged made beaver coins. Managers created these coins by cutting copper and brass from kegs into a rectangular or circular shapes and marking them with his initials and the letters HBC. Some beaver coins introduced between 1854 and 1870 were fractional, including ones that represented 1/2 and 1/4 made beavers.

== Standards of exchange ==
The HBC's London Committee mandated that post managers use consistent standards of exchange. The committee also mandated that managers keep account books in order to track success and prevent cheating. The made beaver was exchanged using two standards: the Official Standard and the Comparative Standard. These standards were instated in order to eliminate competition, maximize profit, and minimize cheating among managers.

The Official Standard gave a value, in made beavers, to every commonly traded item. For example, managers may have been instructed to sell a clay pot for three made beavers. The Comparative Standard gave a value, in made beavers, to each pelt Indigenous peoples brought in for exchange. For example, managers may have been instructed to buy a large, high-quality pelt for five made beavers.

== Private trapping ==
The HBC originally allowed managers to collect their own furs through hunting. This provided managers with an additional source of revenue. The London Committee instructed post managers to trap "all sorts of small furs."

The committee instituted a number of regulations on this practice in order to prevent managers from replacing beaver pelts with lower-quality furs they acquired privately. All private furs had to be disclosed in account books. In addition, all furs had to be sent directly to London for sale where the manager's estate would receive half of the profits. Private trapping was outlawed in 1770.

Post managers also allowed Indigenous peoples to exchange different forms of currency for made beavers. For example, managers would sell 1.42 made beavers for one shilling, and buy one made beaver for 0.7 shillings.

== Private trading ==
In an effort to discourage private trading of pelts, ship captains and trade managers were given monetary incentives. Captains were given a salary of £12 per month and an additional £100 per trip. For every 100 beavers they traded, managers were given three shillings and captains were given one shilling and sixpence. Managers were given £130 annually. If any manager were caught cheating, engaging in private trade, or replacing made beavers with lower-quality furs, he would lose all his wages.

== Beaver decline ==
By 1821, very few beavers remained. At that time, British trade managers stopped purchasing pelts from younger beavers, and the use of the made beaver as a unit of account slowly declined.
