= Want =

Economic term for something that is desired

The idea of want can be examined from many perspectives. In secular societies want might be considered similar to the emotion desire, which can be studied scientifically through the disciplines of psychology or sociology. Alternatively want can be studied in a non-secular, spiritual, moralistic or religious way, particularly by Buddhism but also Christianity, Islam and Judaism.

In philosophy it corresponds to appetition or concupiscence.

In economics, a want is something that is desired. It is said that every person has unlimited wants, but limited resources (economics is based on the assumption that only limited resources are available to us). Thus, people cannot have everything they want and must look for the most affordable alternatives.

Wants are often distinguished from needs. A need is something that is necessary for survival (such as food and shelter), whereas a want is simply something that a person would like to have. Some economists have rejected this distinction and maintain that all of these are simply wants, with varying levels of importance. By this viewpoint, wants and needs can be understood as examples of the overall concept of demand.

Examples of wants that people would like to have is financial monitoring, saving time, higher paying job, more comfort, healthier diet, physical fitness, spirituality, friendship, companionship and safety.

== Non-secular perspectives ==
While in modern secular societies "want" is considered a purely economic, social-scientific or objectively psychological reality of human existence, many religious or spiritual traditions prescribe or advise with lessons on want and wanting, which might alternatively be termed "desire". Buddhism is perhaps the most common example of a religious tradition that offers wisdom and advice about the concept of want and wanting or "desire". The second of the Four Noble Truths of Buddhism is that desire or wanting is a cause for most of the suffering experienced in life. When we want and desire, we create suffering that can never be alleviated, because as detailed in secular economics wants are "unlimited", and hence unfulfilled wants can cause suffering, in unlimited amount. Challenges to this dilemma might include anti-consumerism or Buddhist economics.

In Christianity, particularly Protestantism, want should be kept to a minimum, and a simple life of hard and decent work should be maintained, as described in the Protestant work ethic. From an economic-sociological point of view this might be understood as more value and energy being placed upon production instead of consumption.

== See also ==
- Appetition
- Coincidence of wants
- Volition
- Wish
