= Medium of exchange =

Method by which value is transferred between parties

In economics, a medium of exchange is any item that is widely accepted in exchange for goods and services. In modern economies, the most commonly used medium of exchange is currency. Most forms of money function as media of exchange, including commodity money, representative money, cryptocurrency, and most commonly fiat money. Representative and fiat money exist in digital form as well as physical tokens, for example coins and notes.

Economists, such as William Stanley Jevons, had assumed that exchange media would have arisen in antiquity as awareness grew of the limitations of barter. The form of the medium of exchange follows that of a token, which has been further refined as money. A medium of exchange is one of the functions of money. The medium acts as an intermediary instrument, the use of which can be to acquire any good or service and avoids the limitations of barter; where what one wants has to be matched with what the other has to offer. However, there is little evidence of a pre-monetary society in which barter is the primary mode of exchange; instead, such societies operated largely along the principles of gift economy and debt.

== Relation to origin of money ==
=== Credit as the origin on money ===
In his book Debt: The First 5,000 Years, anthropologist David Graeber argues against the suggestion that money was invented to replace barter. The problem with this version of history, he suggests, is the lack of any supporting evidence. His research indicates that gift economies were common, at least at the beginnings of the first agrarian societies, when humans used elaborate credit systems. Graeber proposes that money as a unit of account was invented the moment when the unquantifiable obligation "I owe you one" transformed into the quantifiable notion of "I owe you one unit of something". In this view, money emerged first as credit and only later acquired the functions of a medium of exchange and a store of value. Graeber's criticism partly relies on and follows that made by A. Mitchell Innes in his 1913 article "What is money?". Innes refutes the barter theory of money, by examining historic evidence and showing that early coins never were of consistent value nor of more or less consistent metal content. Therefore, he concludes that sales is not exchange of goods for some universal commodity, but an exchange for credit. He argues that "credit and credit alone is money". Anthropologist Caroline Humphrey examines the available ethnographic data and concludes that "No example of a barter economy, pure and simple, has ever been described, let alone the emergence from it of money; all available ethnography suggests that there never has been such a thing".

Economists Robert P. Murphy and George Selgin replied to Graeber saying that the barter hypothesis is consistent with economic principles, and a barter system would be too brief to leave a permanent record. John Alexander Smith from Bella Caledonia said that in this exchange Graeber is the one acting as a scientist by trying to falsify the barter hypotheses, while Selgin is taking a theological stance by taking the hypothesis as truth revealed from authority.

=== Barter as the origin of money ===
In a barter transaction, one valuable good is exchanged for another of approximately equivalent value. William Stanley Jevons described how a widely accepted medium allows each barter exchange to be split into three difficulties of barter. A medium of exchange is deemed to eliminate the need for a coincidence of wants.

==== Want of coincidence ====
A barter exchange requires each party to a transaction to have something the other desires. A medium of exchange removes that requirement, allowing an individual to sell and buy from various parties via an intermediary instrument.

==== Want of a measure of value ====
A barter market theoretically requires a value being known of every commodity, which is both impractical to arrange and impractical to maintain. If all exchanges go 'through' an intermediate medium, such as money, then goods can be priced in terms of that one medium. The medium of exchange allows the relative values of items in the marketplace to be set and adjusted with ease. This is a dimension of the modern fiat money system referred to as a "unit of account."

==== Want of means of subdivision ====
A barter transaction requires that both objects being bartered be of equivalent value. A medium of exchange is able to be subdivided into small enough units to approximate the value of any good or service.

==== Transactions over time ====
A barter transaction typically happens on the spot or over a short period of time. Money, on the other hand, also functions as a store of value, until what is wanted becomes available.

== Conflict with store-of-value function ==
An ideal medium of exchange is spread throughout the marketplace to allow individuals with exchange potential to buy and sell. When money serves the function of a store of value, as fiat money does, there are conflicting drivers of monetary policy. This is because a store of value can become more valuable if it is scarce in the marketplace. When the medium of exchange is scarce, traders will pay to rent it (interest), which acts as an impedance to trade. In stable or deflationary environments, interest is a net transfer of wealth from debtor to creditor. Under inflationary environments, interest is a net transfer of wealth from creditor to the debtor.

Silvio Gesell believed that the function of money as a store of value is fundamentally incompatible with its function as a medium of exchange for maximum economic efficiency. He viewed medium of exchange to be the only legitimate function of money. Gesell proposed demurrage currency as a form of money that would function solely as a medium of exchange, without the impedance of being a store of value.

"Only money that goes out of date like a newspaper, rots like potatoes, rusts like iron, evaporates like ether, is capable of standing the test as an instrument for the exchange of potatoes, newspapers, iron and ether. For such money is not preferred to goods either by the purchaser or the seller. We then part with our goods for money only because we need the money as a means of exchange, not because we expect an advantage from possession of the money. So we must make money worse as a commodity if we wish to make it better as a medium of exchange."

— Silvio Gesell, The Natural Economic Order

== Relation to measure of value ==
Fiat currencies function as money with "no intrinsic value" but rather exchange values which facilitate a measurable value of exchange. The market measures or sets the real value of various goods and services using the medium of exchange as a unit of measure i.e., standard or the yard stick of measurement of wealth. There is no other alternative to the mechanism used by the market to set, determine, or measure the value of various goods and services. Determination of price is an essential condition for justice in exchange, efficient allocation of resources, economic growth, welfare and justice. The most important and essential function of a medium of exchange is to be widely acceptable and have relatively stable purchasing power (real value). The following characteristics are essential:

1. Value common assets
2. Common and accessible
3. Constant utility
4. Low cost of preservation
5. Transportability
6. Divisibility
7. High market value in relation to volume and weight
8. Recognisability
9. Resistance to counterfeiting

Some critics of the prevailing system of fiat money argue that fiat money is the root cause of the continuum of economic crises, since it leads to the dominance of fraud, corruption, and manipulation, precisely as it does not satisfy the criteria for a medium of exchange cited above. Specifically, prevailing fiat money is free-floating, and depending upon its supply market finds or sets a value to it that continues to change as the supply of money shifts with respect to the economy's demand. Increasing free-floating money supply with respect to needs of the economy reduces the quantity of the basket of the goods and services. It is not a unit or standard measure of wealth and so the manipulation impedes the market mechanism by setting or determining just prices. This leads to a situation where no value-related economic data is just or reliable. On the other hand, Chartalists claim that the ability to manipulate the value of fiat money is an advantage, in that fiscal stimulus is more easily available in times of economic crisis.

Because fiat money has "no intrinsic value," when two parties use the same fiat money then the person purchasing the product or service can focus on the time price and ignore the monetary price. For example, if a person makes $5.00 an hour and wants to buy a product that costs $20.00 then the time price will be 4 hours and the actual price in fiat money need not be the focus.

== Types and use ==
Although the unit of account must be in some way related to the medium of exchange in use, e.g. ensuring coinage is in denominations of that unit, making accounting simpler to perform, it is more often the case that media of exchange have no natural relationship to that unit, and must be 'minted' as having that value. Further, there may be variances in quality of the underlying good which may not have fully agreed perceived value grading. The difference between the two functions becomes obvious when one considers the fact that coins were very often 'shaved.' Precious metal was removed from them, leaving them still useful as an identifiable coin in the marketplace, for a certain number of units in trade, but which no longer had the quantity of metal supplied by the coin's minter. It was observed as early as Oresme, Copernicus and then in 1558 by Sir Thomas Gresham, that "bad" money drives out "good" in any marketplace; (Gresham's law states "Where legal tender laws exist, bad money drives out good money"). A more precise definition follows that: "A currency that is artificially overvalued by law will drive out of circulation a currency that is artificially undervalued by that law." A common explanation is that people will always keep the less adultered, less clipped, less filed, less trimmed coin, and offer the other in the marketplace for the full units for which it is marked. It is inevitably the bad coins proffered, good ones retained.

Banks as financial intermediaries between ultimate savers and borrowers, and their ability to generate a medium of exchange marked higher than a fiat currency's store of value, is the basis of banking. Central banking is based on the principle that no medium requires more than the guarantee of the state that it can be redeemed for payment of debt as "legal tender" – so all money equally backed by the state is considered good money, within that state. So long as that state produces anything of value to others, the medium of exchange has some value, and the currency may also be useful as a standard of deferred payment among others.

Of all functions of money, the medium of exchange function has historically been the most problematic due to counterfeiting, the systematic and deliberate creation of bad money with no authorization to do so, leading to the driving out of the good money entirely.

Other functions rely not on recognition of some token or weight of metal in a marketplace, where time to detect any counterfeit is limited and benefits for successful passing-off are high, but on more stable long term social contracts: one cannot easily force a whole society to accept a different standard of deferred payment, require even small groups of people to uphold a floor price for a store of value, still less to re-price everything and rewrite all accounts to a unit of account (the most stable function). Thus it tends to be the medium of exchange function that constrains what can be used as a form of financial capital.

It was once common in the United States to widely accept a check (British English: cheque) as a medium of exchange, several parties endorsing it perhaps multiple times before it would eventually be deposited for its value in units of account, and thus redeemed. This practice became less common as it was exploited by forgers and led to a domino effect of bounced checks – a forerunner of the kind of fragility that electronic systems would eventually bring.

In the age of electronic money it was, and remains, common to use very long strings of difficult-to-reproduce numbers, generated by encryption methods, to authenticate transactions and commitments as having come from trusted parties. Thus the medium of exchange function has become wholly a part of the marketplace and its signals, and is utterly integrated with the unit of account function, so that, given the integrity of the public key system on which these are based, they become to that degree inseparable. This has clear advantages – counterfeiting is difficult or impossible unless the whole system is compromised, say by a new factoring algorithm. But at that point, the entire system is broken and the whole infrastructure is obsolete – new keys must be re-generated and the new system will also depend on some assumptions about difficulty of factoring.

Due to this inherent fragility, which is even more profound with electronic voting, some economists argue that units of account should not ever be abstracted or confused with the nominal units or tokens used in exchange. A medium is simply a medium, and should not be confused for the message.

== See also ==
- Authentication
- Cheque
- Commodity money
- Forgery
- History of money
- Identity theft
- Private currency

== Bibliography ==
- Jones, Robert A. "The Origin and Development of Media of Exchange." Journal of Political Economy 84 (Nov. 1976): 757-775.
