= Time price =

Economics concept

A time price is the amount of time a person needs to work to earn the amount of money necessary to buy a particular product or service. For example, if a person makes $5.00 an hour and wants to buy a product that costs $20.00 then the time price will be 4 hours.

Time prices are universal, meaning that they are not dependent on any particular currency, and reflect the amount of time needed to achieve the goal of obtaining a product or service with money used only as a medium of exchange, making the type of currency irrelevant. The following is the equation for Time Price:

time price = (Nominal Money Price)/(nominal hourly income)

Note that the equation uses "nominal" like in the use of nominal GDP. Specifically, the money price and hourly income in the equation are given without adjusting for inflation.

Inflation focuses on the buying power of a given currency over time. However, inflation and people's salary changes over time do not align.

Consider a Hershey's candy bar. In 1935–1939, a 1.5-ounce Hershey candy bar cost 5¢ (or 3.3¢ per ounce). From 2005 to 2009 a 1.6-ounce Hershey candy bar cost $1.10 (or 50¢ per ounce). The federal minimum wage in 1938 was $0.25 (25¢) and in 2009 it was $7.25. To make a fair comparison, consider the cost of 3.3¢ per ounce of Hershey's chocolate from 1935 to 1939 to 50¢ per ounce of Hershey's chocolate from 2005 to 2009.

The time price in 1938 to purchase an ounce of Hershey's chocolate for a minimum wage worker would have been about 8 minutes (0.033/0.25 = 7.92 minutes (0.132 hours)) and the time price in 2009 would have been about 4 minutes (0.50/7.25 = 4.14 minutes (0.069 hours)). In other words, even though the cost of Hershey's chocolate has gone up significantly, a person making federal minimum wage only had to work approximately half the time in 2009 as in 1938 to buy the same amount of chocolate.

The following line chart shows the time prices of 1 ounce of Hershey chocolate from 1938 to 2009 based on the federal minimum wage from and the cost per ounce of chocolate from. The line chart shows that it took almost 8 minutes at the federal minimum wage to buy 1 ounce of Hershey's chocolate in 1938. The time price continued down to its lowest point of 1.88 minutes in 1968 and 1969. The trend then reversed and went up until it peaked in 1995 at 6.11 minutes before falling again.

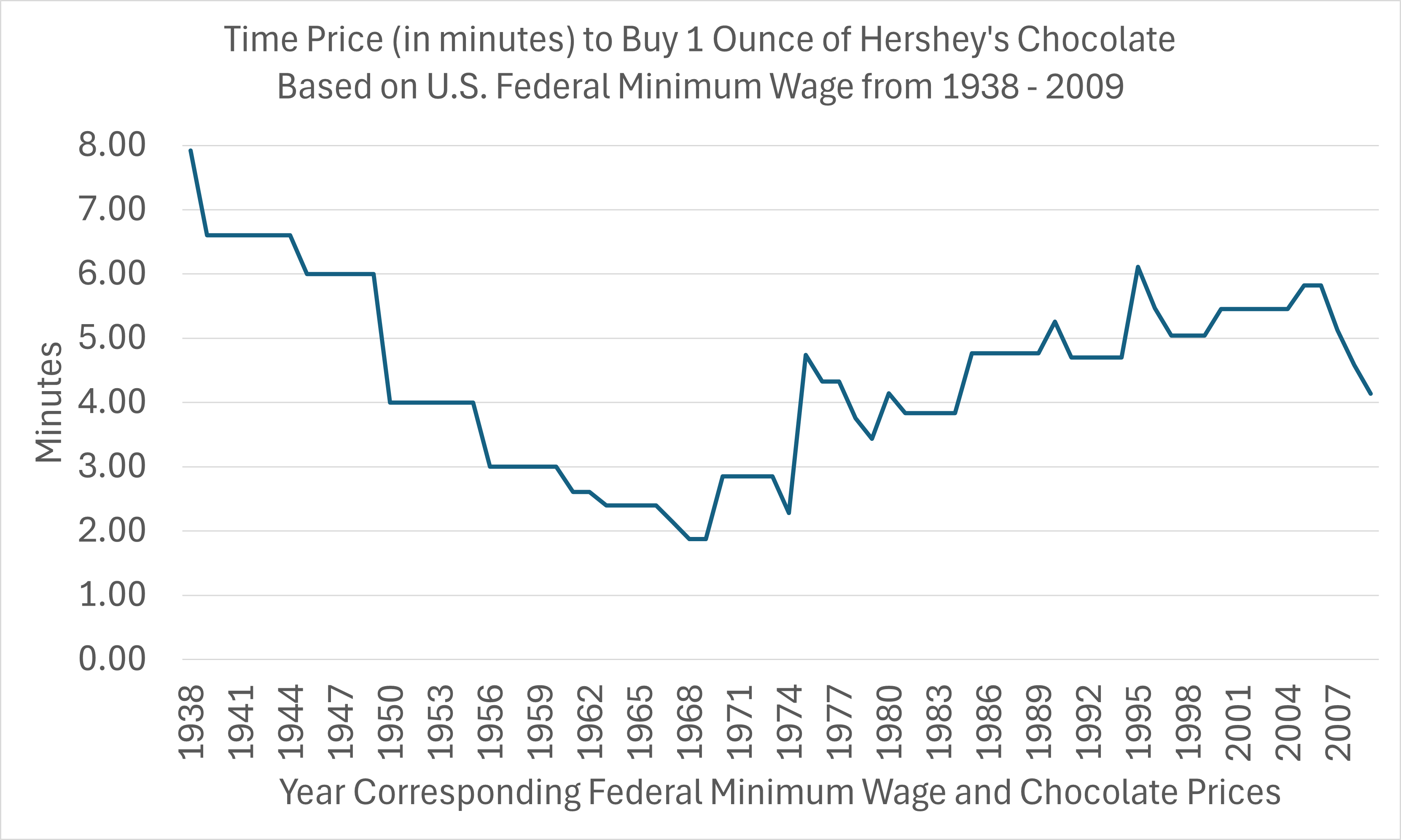
Time Price of 1 ounce of Hershey Chocolate from 1938 to 2009 Based on U.S. Federal Minimum Wage.

== Time prices differ based on circumstance ==
Time prices are dependent on a person's circumstance and are not as generalizable as inflation. Different working classes (e.g., blue-collar vs white-collar wages) affect time prices because of salary differences.

For example, if a person makes $20 an hour of net income and wants to buy a television that costs $500 then the television will have a time price of 25 hours (500/20 = 25 hours). However, if that same person gets an increase in salary and now makes $40 an hour of net income then the time price is halved (500/40 = 12 1/2 hours).

Time prices can help make personal decisions. For example, consider a person who has decided to rent an apartment but needs to decide between two apartment rent prices. The exact amount in rent difference between the two choices can be skipped by considering the time cost difference instead of the monetary cost.

Also, a time price calculation can be used to help determine the opportunity cost of do it yourself projects. For example, a person might need an oil change for a vehicle. Determining the time price of paying a professional will help the person compare that time to the time required to buy the replacement oil, remove the used oil from the vehicle, properly dispose the oil, etc.

== 1 hour of light example ==
In ancient Babylon, around 2000 BCE, an entire day's worth of work would get a person approximately 10 minutes of artificial light. Nobel Prize-Winning economist William Nordhaus approximated that obtaining one hour of artificial light in the year 1800 AD took 5.37 hours of labor. On the other hand, with recent advancements in LED lightbulbs one hour of artificial light in the year 2022 AD took approximately 0.16 seconds of labor.

From ancient Babylon to the present, the time price of working to pay for artificial light has decreased in a dramatic fashion.

== Other considerations ==
Although time prices can be helpful in many situations, they can also be difficult to generalize. For example, time prices also fluctuate based on cost-of-living index similar to how inflation may differ based on regional variability of prices.
