= Hudson's Bay tokens =

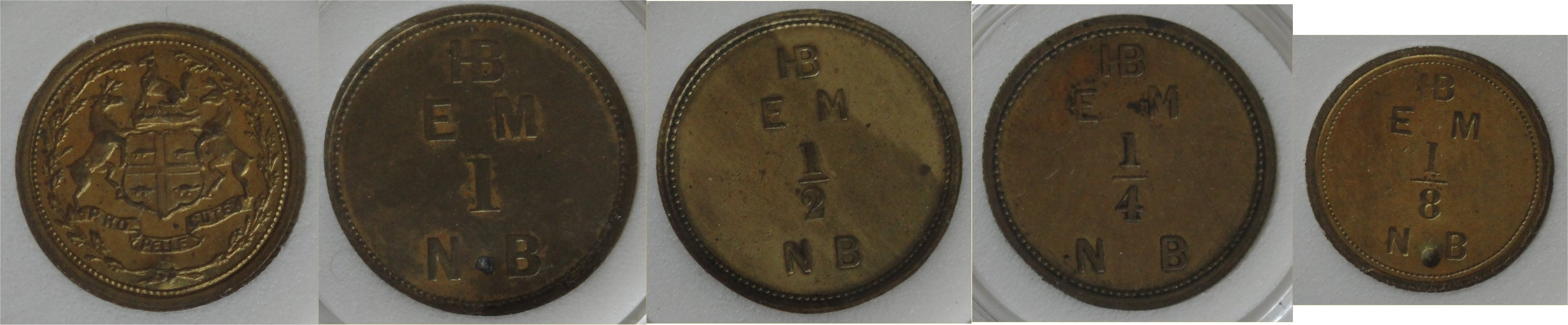
Hudson's Bay Company tokens used in the East Main District

Hudson's Bay Company tokens include a number of tokens used as currency in the fur trade and at some Hudson's Bay Company stores and posts at various times throughout the nineteenth and twentieth centuries.

== East Main District ==
The largest—one "Made Beaver"—was equal in value to the skin on an adult male beaver in good condition. Smaller sizes represented one-half, one-quarter, and one-eighth of a Made-Beaver. One side of the brass token bears the Hudson's Bay Company's coat of arms and the other its value. Before these brass tokens came into use, a Made-Beaver was represented by a stick, porcupine quill, an ivory disc, a musket ball, or anything else agreed upon by trader and trapper. The trapper would be handed a number of units agreed upon—representing the value of his catch—and with these would make his purchases from the store. The tokens were designed by George Simpson Mctavish of Albany Fort in 1854.

== Eastern Arctic Tokens ==
Uniface aluminum tokens were introduced in the Eastern Arctic District in 1946. Circular tokens were available in five, ten, twenty-five, fifty, and one hundred cent denominations. A square token represented one "Arctic Fox", a standard unit of trade used by the Hudson's Bay Company in the arctic. The tokens fell out of use in the early 1960s.

== Yorkton Saskatchewan Tokens ==
These aluminum tokens were issued by the Hudson's Bay Company store manager in Yorkton Saskatchewan to pay local farmers for their produce. The tokens could then be used by the farmers for goods at the Yorkton store. These tokens were available in five, ten, twenty-five, fifty, and one dollar denominations. The tokens were in use during the early twentieth century.

== Parsons' Tokens ==
These triangular or rectangular tokens were cut from sheets of copper or lead and marked with "Parsons". They were issued and used at posts along the Hudson's Strait and Baffin Island from 1908-1918. They were issued by Ralph Parsons who was responsible for opening new trade posts in these areas.

== Labrador District Tokens ==
These tokens were introduced around 1919 to replace the earlier issued Parson's Tokens. They were first made of tin, with later versions struck on aluminum. They were issued in various denominations of "Made Beaver".

== St Lawrence - Labrador District Tokens ==
Following the amalgamation of the Labrador and St. Lawrence Districts in 1922, these circular aluminum tokens were issued in denominations of one, five, ten, and twenty "Made Beavers".
