= Unit of account =

Standard numerical measure used to value and compare goods and services

In economics, unit of account, sometimes called currency unit or monetary unit, is a standard unit of measurement of the market value of goods, services, and other transactions. Also known as a measure of relative worth and a standard of deferred payment, a unit of account is a necessary prerequisite for the formulation of commercial agreements that involve debt. It is one of the functions of money. it is a basis for quoting and bargaining of prices and it is necessary for developing accounting systems.

A given base unit of account (analogous to base unit of measurement) may have derived units of account or subunits; for example, one cent equals a hundredth (1/100) of a dollar or other base units of many currencies.

Unit of account in economics allows a somewhat meaningful interpretation of prices, costs, and profits, so that an entity can monitor its own performance. It allows shareholders to make sense of its past performance and have an idea of its future profitability. The use of money, as a relatively stable unit of measure, can tend to drive market economies toward efficiency.

Historically, prices were often given in a dominant currency used as a unit of account, but transactions actually settled by using a variety of coins that were available, and often goods, all converted into their value in the unit of account. Many international transactions continue to be settled in this way, using a notional value (most often expressed in the US dollar or euro) but with the actual settlement in something else.

In historical cost accounting, currencies are assumed to be perfectly stable in real value during non-hyperinflationary conditions under in terms of which the stable measuring unit assumption is applied. The Daily Consumer Price Index (Daily CPI) – or a monetized daily indexed unit of account – can be used to index monetary values on a daily basis when it is required to maintain the purchasing power or real value of monetary values constant during inflation and deflation.

== Problems ==
Money is rarely perfectly stable in real value which is the fundamental problem with traditional historical cost accounting which is based on the stable measuring unit assumption. The unit of account in economics suffers from the pitfall of not being stable in real value over time because money is generally not perfectly stable in real value during inflation and deflation. Inflation destroys the assumption that the real value of the unit of account is stable which is the basis of classic accountancy. In such circumstances, historical values registered in accountancy books become heterogeneous amounts measured in different units. The use of such data under traditional accounting methods without previous correction can lead to confusing — (or even meaningless) — results.

== History ==
Coins or moneys of account were in most cases originally based on an existing coin or money but could remain in use as a unit of account even when the original coin or money was no longer in circulation.

Historic examples of units of measure include the livre tournois, used in France from 1302 to 1794 whether or not livre coins were minted. In the 14th century Naples used the grossi gigliati, and Bohemia used the Prague groschen (2021).

At any one time there might be two or three units of account in one region based on the local base, silver and sometimes gold coins, and each often expressed in L.S.D units in ratio 240:12:1. The Florentine gold florin, the French franc and the electoral rheingulden all became pounds (240 denari) of account. Units of account would often survive over 100 years despite the original coins changing composition and availability (e.g. the Castilian maravedi).

In 1921, Henry Ford proposed the use of energy as the basis for currency instead of Gold Standard. Thomas Edison similarly put forward commodities as a basis. At the onset of the Great Depression, John P. Norton restated the "Electric Dollars" standard alongside gold.

A modern unit of account is the European Currency Unit, used in the European Union from 1979 to 1998; its replacement in 1999, the Euro, was also just a unit of account until the introduction of notes and coins in 2002.

Unit of account is the main way of calculating a carrier or ship owner's liability in relation to carriage of goods contracts in which the Hague-Visby Rules apply.

In economics, a standard unit of account is used for statistical purposes to describe economic activity. Indexes such as GDP and the CPI are so broad in their scope that compiling them would be impossible without a standard unit of account. After being compiled, these figures are often used to guide governmental policy; especially monetary and fiscal policy.

In calculating the opportunity cost of a policy, a standard unit of account allows for the creation of a composite good. A composite good is a theoretical abstraction that represents an aggregation of all other opportunities that are not realized by the first good. It allows an economic decision's benefits to be weighed against the costs of all other possible goods in that society, without having to refer to any directly. Often, this is most easily accomplished with money.

== Finance ==
The use of a unit of account in financial accounting, according to the American business model, allows investors to invest capital into those companies that provide the highest rate of return. The use of a unit of account in managerial accounting enables firms to choose between activities that yield the highest profit.

== Accounting ==
The unit of account in financial accounting refers to the words used to describe the specific assets and liabilities that are reported in financial statements rather than the units used to measure them. That is, unit of account refers to the object of recognition or display whereas unit of measure refers to the tool for measuring it.

Unit of measure and unit of account are sometimes treated as synonyms in financial accounting and economics. Unit of measure in financial accounting refers to the monetary unit to be used; that is, whether it should be nominal units of money as opposed to units that are adjusted for changes in purchasing power over time.

== See also ==
- Equivalization
- Inflation accounting
- Medium of exchange
- Store of value
- System of measurement
- Units of measurement
- Numéraire
