= Store of value =

Inflation-resistant asset

A store of value is any commodity or asset that would normally retain purchasing power into the future and is the function of the asset that can be saved, retrieved and exchanged at a later time, and be predictably useful when retrieved.

The most common store of value in modern times has been money, currency, or a commodity like a precious metal or financial capital. The point of any store of value is risk management due to a stable demand for the underlying asset.

== Money as a store of value ==
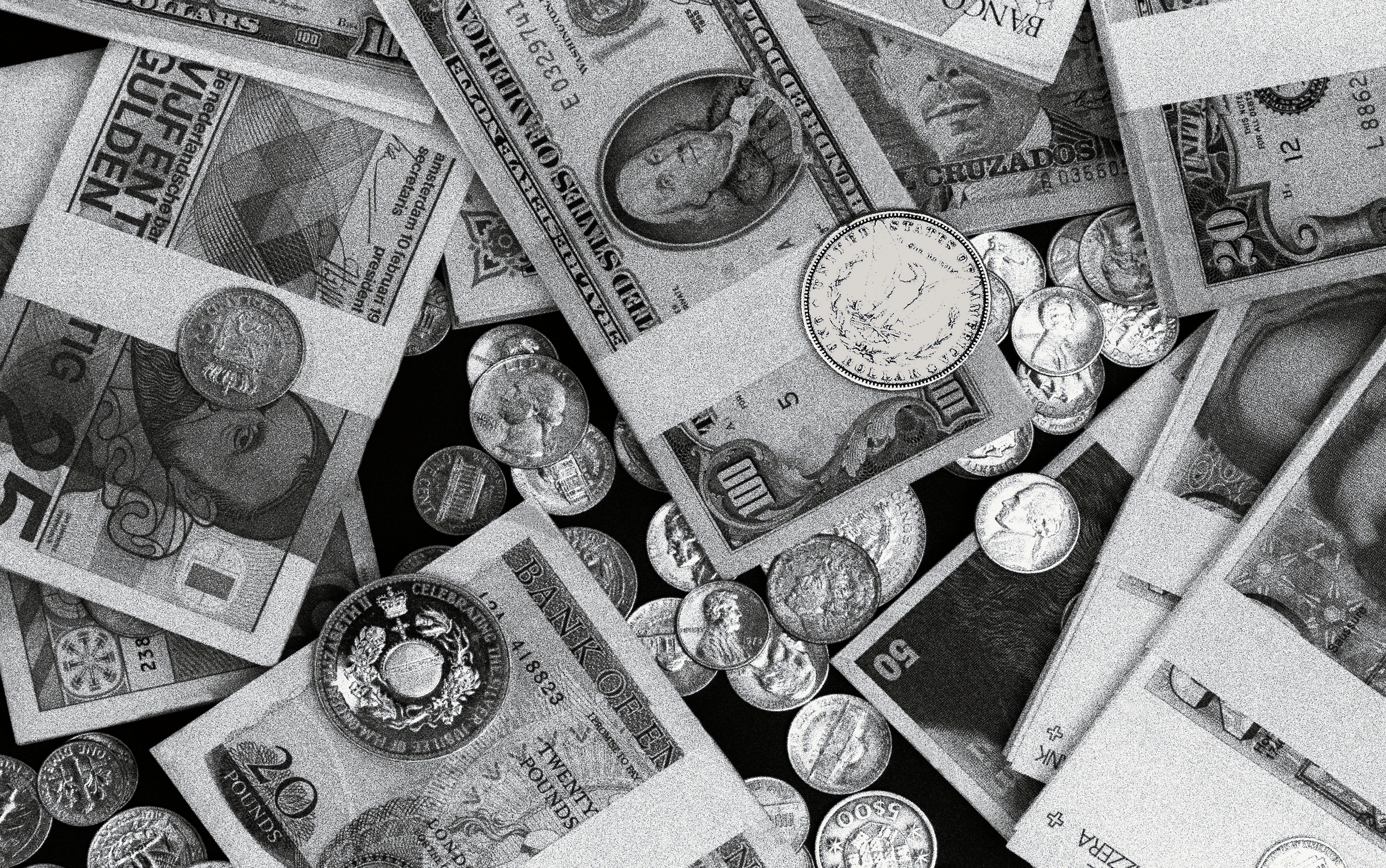
Various bills and coins

Monetary economics is the branch of economics which analyses the functions of money. Storage of value is one of the three generally accepted functions of money. The other functions are the medium of exchange, which is used as an intermediary to avoid the inconveniences of the coincidence of wants, and the unit of account, which allows the value of various goods, services, assets and liabilities to be rendered in multiples of the same unit. Money is well-suited to storing value because of its purchasing power. It is also useful because of its durability.

Because of its function as a store of value, large quantities of money are hoarded. Money's usefulness as a store of value declines if there are significant changes in the general level of prices. So if inflation rises, purchasing power declines and a cost is placed on those holding money.

Workers who are paid in a currency which is experiencing high inflation will prefer to spend their income quickly instead of saving it. When a currency loses its store of value, or more accurately when a currency is perceived to lose its future purchasing power, it fails to function as money. This causes people to use currencies from other countries as a substitute.

According to the Cambridge cash-balance theory, which is represented by the Cambridge equation, money's ability to store value is more important than its function as a medium of exchange. Cambridge claims that the demand for money is derived from its ability to store value. This is contrary to Fisher economists' belief that demand arises because money is needed for exchange.

While most money can be hoarded, demurrage money is a type of money which is deliberately designed to not be used as a store of value.

== Other stores of value ==
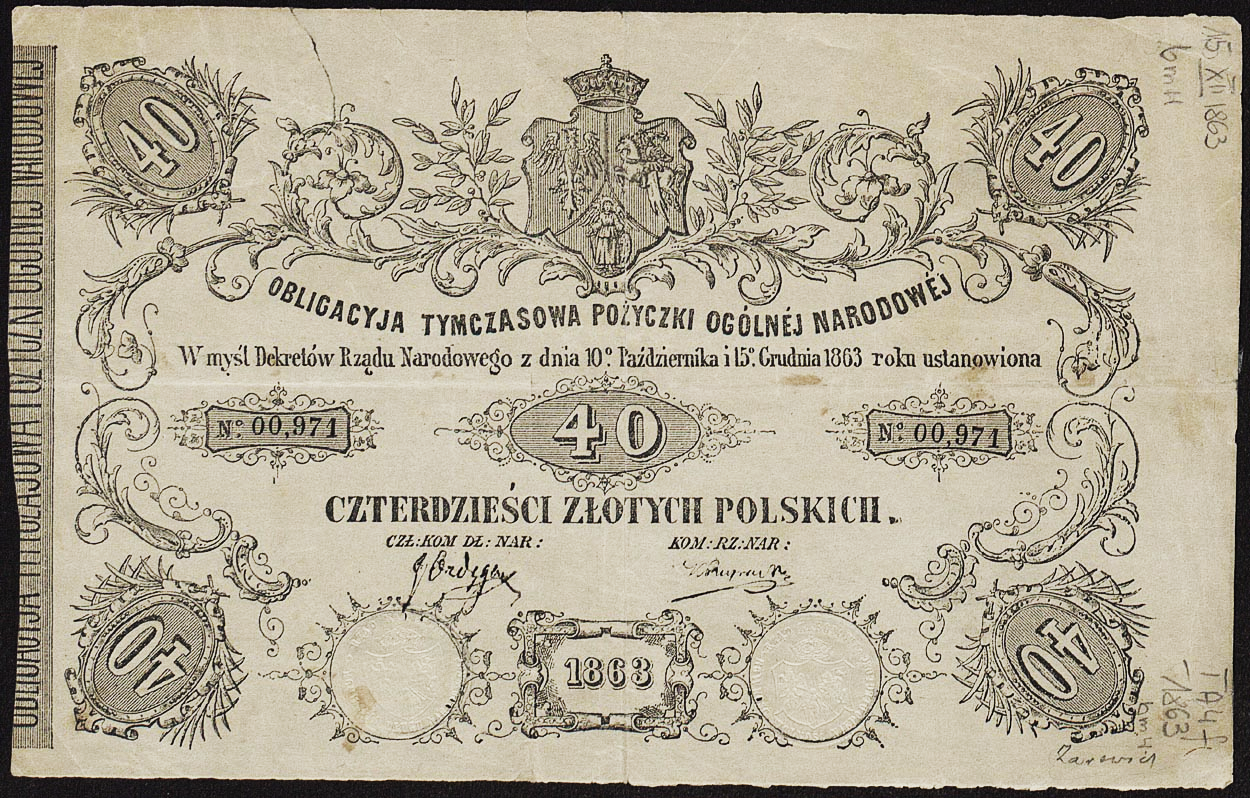
Polish National Government bond, 1863

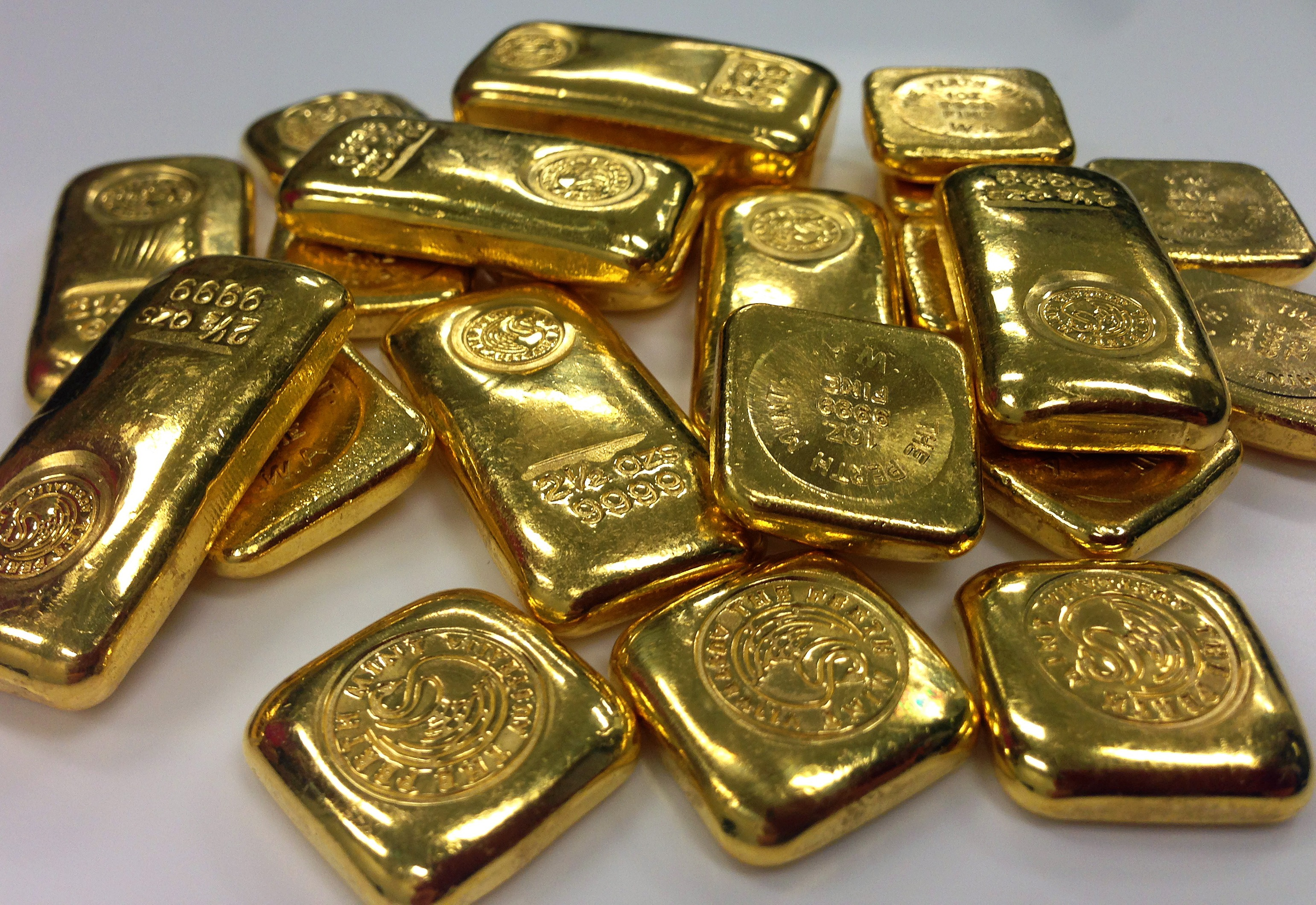
Commodities such as gold and other precious metals have historically been good stores of value

The term cash is often used to indicate both currency, which is usually represented by paper money or coins in industrialized countries, and sums deposited and payable almost immediately on order.

Apart from cash, legal tender issued on the fiat of a sovereign government, examples of assets used as potential stores of value are:

- Real estate, e.g. home-ownership, rental property, or through financial securities or fractional ownership
- Commodities (especially through financial assets), such as natural gas or soybean
- Physical gold or other precious metals, such as gold coins, platinum or silver bullions
- Collectibles or artworks, e.g. gemstones, antiques, coins, paintings, wines

In addition, currency can take many alternative forms, such as cryptocurrency, livestock (e.g. some pre-colonial African currencies), labor vouchers, gift economy relationships or stored-value cards (value is recorded directly on computer chips of the cards).

While the above-mentioned assets may be inconvenient to trade daily or store, and may vary in value quite significantly, they are expected to rarely lose all value. It need not be a capital asset at all, merely have economic value that is not believed to disappear even in the worst situation.

The disadvantage for land, houses and property as a store for value is that it may take time to find a buyer for those assets.

As stores of value, gold and precious metals are generally favored to industrial commodities, because of their demand and rarity in nature, which reduces the risk of devaluation associated with increased production and supply.

Cryptocurrency's role as a store of value is currently a matter of debate. The Internal Revenue Service has issued guidance on "virtual currencies" that refers to them as "a medium of exchange, a unit of account, and/or a store of value." The cryptocurrency Bitcoin is often compared by advocates to gold. In their role as a store of value, cryptocurrencies often elicit concern, due to their extreme volatility, or due to concerns about the emergence of regulation and contradictory handling by governments.

== See also ==
- Bretton Woods system
- Cincinnati Time Store
- Constant purchasing power accounting
- Full-reserve banking
- Great Depression
- Official gold reserves
- Value network
