= Coincidence of wants =

Concept in economy

The coincidence of wants (often known as double coincidence of wants) is an economic phenomenon where two parties each hold an item that the other wants, so they exchange these items directly. Within economics, this has often been presented as the foundation of a bartering economy.

In principle, double coincidence of wants would mean that both parties must agree to sell and buy each product. Under this system, problems arise through the improbability of the wants, needs, or events that cause or motivate a transaction occurring at the same time and the same place. One example is the bar musician who is "paid" with liquor or food, items which his landlord will not accept as rent payment, when the musician would rather have a month's shelter. If, instead, the musician's landlord were to throw a party and desire music for it, hiring the musician to play it by offering the month's rent in exchange, a coincidence of wants would exist.

In-kind transactions have several limitations as it only effectively works if one party actually has the item, or is willing to make said item, that the other party is seeking. Having a monetary medium can resolve this issue as it provides freedom for the former to work on or give away other items of interest, instead of being burdened to provide a particular item to the latter, impeding innovation in the long term, especially if barter was implemented on a larger scale. They can also only focus on satisfying parties that have monetary medium. Meanwhile, the latter party can use their medium of wage to wait and see which party would provide them the item they want.

Besides barter, other kinds of in-kind transactions also suffer from the coincidence of wants problem in the absence of a medium of exchange. Romance, for example often relies on a double coincidence of wants. If Max likes Mallory but Mallory does not like Max, then the two cannot meaningfully exchange the benefits of romance. Only if there exists a coincidence of wants can a mutually beneficial relationship be established without a medium of exchange.

John Hickman argues that barter may characterize future interplanetary trade because the much lower costs of communication compared with transportation will make a shared currency between the economies of the two worlds impossible.

As another example, when wealth is transferred during marriage, divorce, inheritance, and other crucial life events, or during the collection of taxes or tribute, it is improbable that this event will coincide with the recipient's desire for the products the payer can readily obtain. All of these transactions entail an improbable coincidence of wants and events which can be resolved by the existence of a monetary medium.

Metcalfe's law can be interpreted as a consequence of coincidence of wants, as n co-interacting individuals have n^{2} opportunities to potentially satisfy the conditions of coincidence amongst themselves. That is to say, a mechanism that expedites the coincidence of wants is itself perceived to have value proportional to the rate of coincidences found through the mechanism.

== See also ==
- Want
- Barter system
