= Reserve army of labour =

Marxist term to describe the unemployed and undereployed in capitalist society

Reserve army of labour is a concept in Karl Marx's critique of political economy. It refers to the unemployed and underemployed in capitalist society. It is synonymous with "industrial reserve army" or "relative surplus population", except that the unemployed can be defined as those actually looking for work and that the relative surplus population also includes people unable to work. The use of the word "army" refers to the workers being conscripted and regimented in the workplace in a hierarchy under the command or authority of the owners of capital.

Marx did not invent the term "reserve army of labour". It was already being used by Friedrich Engels in his 1845 book The Condition of the Working Class in England. What Marx did was theorize the reserve army of labour as a necessary part of the capitalist organization of work.

Prior to what Marx regarded as the start of the capitalist era in human history (i.e. before the 16th century), structural unemployment on a mass scale rarely existed, other than that caused by natural disasters and wars. In ancient societies, all people who could work necessarily had to work, otherwise they would starve; and a slave or a serf by definition could not become "unemployed". There was normally very little possibility of "earning a crust" without working at all, and the usual attitude toward beggars and idlers was harsh. Children began to work at a very early age.

== Marx's discussion of the concept ==
Although the idea of the industrial reserve army of labour is closely associated with Marx, it was already in circulation in the British labour movement by the 1830s. Engels discussed the reserve army of labour in his famous book The Condition of the Working Class in England (1845) before Marx did. The first mention of the reserve army of labour in Marx's writing occurs in a manuscript he wrote in 1847, but did not publish:

Big industry constantly requires a reserve army of unemployed workers for times of overproduction. The main purpose of the bourgeois in relation to the worker is, of course, to have the commodity labour as cheaply as possible, which is only possible when the supply of this commodity is as large as possible in relation to the demand for it, i.e., when the overpopulation is the greatest. Overpopulation is therefore in the interest of the bourgeoisie, and it gives the workers good advice which it knows to be impossible to carry out. Since capital only increases when it employs workers, the increase of capital involves an increase of the proletariat, and, as we have seen, according to the nature of the relation of capital and labour, the increase of the proletariat must proceed relatively even faster. The above theory, however, which is also expressed as a law of nature, that population grows faster than the means of subsistence, is the more welcome to the bourgeois as it silences his conscience, makes hard-heartedness into a moral duty and the consequences of society into the consequences of nature, and finally gives him the opportunity to watch the destruction of the proletariat by starvation as calmly as any other natural event without bestirring himself, and, on the other hand, to regard the misery of the proletariat as its own fault and to punish it. To be sure, the proletarian can restrain his natural instinct by reason, and so, by moral supervision, halt the law of nature in its injurious course of development.

— Karl Marx, Wages, December 1847

The idea of the labour force as an "army" occurs also in Part 1 of The Communist Manifesto, written by Marx and Engels in 1848:

Modern Industry has converted the little workshop of the patriarchal master into the great factory of the industrial capitalist. Masses of labourers, crowded into the factory, are organised like soldiers. As privates of the industrial army they are placed under the command of a perfect hierarchy of officers and sergeants. Not only are they slaves of the bourgeois class, and of the bourgeois State; they are daily and hourly enslaved by the machine, by the overlooker, and, above all, by the individual bourgeois manufacturer himself. The more openly this despotism proclaims gain to be its end and aim, the more petty, the more hateful and the more embittering it is.

Marx introduces the concept of the reserve army of labour in chapter 25 of the first volume of Capital: Critique of Political Economy, twenty years later in 1867, stating the following:

[...] capitalistic accumulation itself [...] constantly produces, and produces in the direct ratio of its own energy and extent, a relatively redundant population of workers, i.e., a population of greater extent than suffices for the average needs of the valorisation of capital, and therefore a surplus-population... It is the absolute interest of every capitalist to press a given quantity of labour out of a smaller, rather than a greater number of labourers, if the cost is about the same. [...] The more extended the scale of production, the stronger this motive. Its force increases with the accumulation of capital.

His argument is that as capitalism develops, the organic composition of capital will increase, which means that the mass of constant capital grows faster than the mass of variable capital. Fewer workers can produce all that is necessary for society's requirements. In addition, capital will become more concentrated and centralized in fewer hands.

This being the absolute historical tendency under capitalism, part of the working population will tend to become surplus to the requirements of capital accumulation over time. Paradoxically, the larger the wealth of society, the larger the industrial reserve army will become. One could add that the larger the wealth of society, the more people it can also support who do not work.

However, as Marx develops the argument further it also becomes clear that depending on the state of the economy, the reserve army of labour will either expand or contract, alternately being absorbed or expelled from the employed workforce:

Taking them as a whole, the general movements of wages are exclusively regulated by the expansion and contraction of the industrial reserve army, and these again correspond to the periodic changes of the industrial cycle. They are, therefore, not determined by the variations of the absolute number of the working population, but by the varying proportions in which the working-class is divided into active and reserve army, by the increase or diminution in the relative amount of the surplus-population, by the extent to which it is now absorbed, now set free.

Marx concludes as such: "Relative surplus-population is therefore the pivot upon which the law of demand and supply of labour works". The availability of labour influences wage rates and the larger the unemployed workforce grows, the more this forces down wage rates; conversely, if there are plenty jobs available and unemployment is low, this tends to raise the average level of wages—in that case workers are able to change jobs rapidly to get better pay.

== Composition of the relative surplus population ==
Marx discusses the army of labor and the reserve army in Capital Volume I, Chapter 25, Section IV. The army of labor consists in those working class people employed in average or better than average jobs. Not every one in the working class gets one of these jobs. There are then four other categories where members of the working class might find themselves: the stagnant pool, the floating reserves, the latent reserve and pauperdom. Finally, people may leave the army and the reserve army by turning to criminality, Marx refers to such people as lumpenproletariat.

- The stagnant part consists of marginalised people with "extremely irregular employment". Stagnant pool jobs are characterized by below average pay, dangerous working conditions and they may be temporary. Those caught in the stagnant pool have jobs, so the modern definition of the employed would include both the army of labor plus the stagnant pool. However, they are constantly on the lookout for something better.
- The modern unemployed would refer primarily to the floating reserve, people who used to have good jobs, but are now out of work. They certainly hope that their unemployment is temporary ("conjunctural unemployment"), but they are well aware that they could fall into the stagnant pool or the pauper class.
- The latent part consists of that segment of the population not yet fully integrated into capitalist production. In Marx's day, he was referring to people living off of subsistence agriculture who were looking for monetary employment in industry. In modern times, people coming from slums in developing countries where they survive largely by non-monetary means, to developed cities where they work for pay might form the latent. Housewives who move from unpaid to paid employment for a business could also form a part of the latent reserve. They are not unemployed because they are not necessarily actively looking for a job, but if capital needs extra workers, it can pull them out of the latent reserve. In this sense, the latent forms a reservoir of potential workers for industries.
- Pauperdom is where one might end up. The homeless is the modern term for paupers. Marx calls them people who cannot adapt to capital's never ending change. For Marx, "the sphere of pauperism", including those still able to work, orphans and pauper children and the "demoralised and ragged" or "unable to work".

Marx then analyses the reserve army of labour in detail using data on Britain where he lived.

== Criticism and debates ==
=== Economist criticisms ===
Some economists such as Paul Samuelson have taken issue with Marx's concept of the reserve army of labour. Samuelson argues that much Marxian literature assumes that the mere existence of the unemployed drives down wages, when in reality is dependent upon contingent factors. (Are the unemployed easily available as replacements? Is the mere threat of replacement sufficient to get workers to accept a wage cut or does the employer have to demonstrate this is not an empty threat?) Samuelson argues that if prices also fall with money wage, then this does not mean real wages will fall. Samuelson also argues that wages will fall only until there are no more unemployed to bid it down: the reserve army can reduce wages only by decreasing its size. Samuelson's concludes that to mean that while the unemployed can reduce wages, they are incapable of reducing them to anywhere near subsistence levels before the unemployed all become employed.

A similar argument was made by Murray Rothbard, who argued that if the reserve army lower wages by being absorbed into the ranks of the employed, then eventually it will disappear and be incapable of being a threat (that also means that the risk of perpetual impoverishment is averted). Rothbard observes that this is supported by modern market economics, which holds that unemployment lowers wages and thus ultimately eliminates itself. Thus, Rothbard concludes that the reserve army would ultimately cease to be a threat. Rothbard also argues that industries can experience an increase in demand for other works thanks to increasing productivity caused by technology, which will then decrease unemployment due to a greater demand for workers caused by expanding production capability.

=== Immiseration ===
Some writers have interpreted Marx's argument to mean that an absolute immiseration of the working class would occur as the broad historical trend. Thus, the workers would become more and more impoverished and unemployment would constantly grow. This is no longer credible in the light of the facts because in various epochs and countries workers' living standards have indeed improved rather than declined. In some periods, unemployment had been reduced to a very small amount. In the Great Depression, about one in four workers became unemployed, but towards the end of the post-war boom unemployment in richer countries reduced to a very low level. However, economic historian Paul Bairoch estimated in the mid-1980s that in Latin America, Africa and Asia "total inactivity" among the population was "on the order of 30-40% of potential working man-hours"—a situation without historical precedent, "except perhaps in the case of ancient Rome".

Other writers, such as Ernest Mandel and Roman Rosdolsky, argued that in truth Marx had no theory of an absolute immiseration of the working class; at most, one could say that the rich-poor gap continues to grow, i.e. the wealthy get wealthier much more than ordinary workers improve their living standards. In part, the level of unemployment also seems to be based on the balance of power between social classes and state policy. Governments can allow unemployment to rise, but also implement job-creating policies, which makes unemployment levels partly a political result.

If chapter 25 of Marx's Capital, Volume I is read carefully, it is plain that Marx does not actually say what many critics accuse him of. Marx himself says that the "absolute general law of capitalist accumulation" is that the more that capital grows in size and value, the bigger the working class becomes and the larger the pauperized sections of the working class and the industrial reserve army become. However, he does not say that the whole working class becomes pauperized, but rather that the part of it which is pauperized grows in size. He then carefully qualifies this argument by saying that the absolute general law is "like all other laws [...] modified in its working by many circumstances". Next, Marx says that in proportion as capital accumulates, the situation of the worker, be his payment high or low must "grow worse". It is quite clear from the context though that by "worse" Marx does not primarily mean poverty. He means instead, as he says himself explicitly, that "all means of development of production undergo a dialectical inversion so that they become means of domination and exploitation of the producers". He is talking about "worse" in the sense of "inhuman", "more exploited" or "alienated".

=== Overpopulation ===
Another dispute concerns the notion of "overpopulation". In Marx's own time, Thomas Robert Malthus raised dire predictions that population growth enabled by capitalist wealth would exceed the food supply required to sustain that population. As noted, for Marx "overpopulation" was really more an ideologically loaded term or social construct and Marxists have argued there is no real problem here as enough food can be produced for all; if there is a problem, it lies in the way that food is produced and distributed.

=== Consent ===
In the social welfare area, there are also perpetual disputes about the extent to which unemployment is voluntarily chosen by people, or involuntary, whether it is forced on people or whether it is their own choice. In the Great Depression of the 1930s, when unemployment rose to 20–30% of the working population in many countries, people generally believed it was involuntary, but if unemployment levels are relatively low, the argument that unemployment is a matter of choice is more often heard.

=== Measurement ===
There are endless debates about the best way to measure unemployment, its costs and its effects and to what extent a degree of unemployment is inevitable in any country with a developed labour market. According to the NAIRU concept, price stability in market-based societies necessarily requires a certain amount of unemployment. One reason a reserve army of the unemployed exists in market economies, it is argued, is that if the level of unemployment is too low, it will stimulate price inflation. However, the validity of this argument depends also on state economic policy and on the ability of workers to raise their wages. If for example trade unions are legally blocked from organizing workers, then even if unemployment is relatively low, average wages can be kept low; the only way that individual workers have in that case to raise their income is to work more hours or work themselves up to better-paying jobs.

Normally, the government measure of unemployment defines "unemployed" as "without any job, but actively looking for work". There are also people defined as "jobless", who want work yet are not, or no longer, actively looking for work because they are discouraged and so on. This official view of the matter is closely linked to the administration of unemployment benefits. To be entitled for an unemployment benefit, it is a requirement that the beneficiary is actively looking for work.

=== Hidden unemployment ===
There are also many controversies about hidden unemployment. Hidden unemployment means that people are not counted or considered as unemployed, although in reality they are unemployed. For example, young people will stay in the family home, in schooling, or in some make-work scheme because they can not find a paid job. People might also have a job, but they might be underemployed because they cannot get more working hours or they cannot get a job for which they are qualified. People might also drop out of the official labour force because they are discouraged and no longer actively looking for work; they are no longer counted as unemployed, although they are. Governments can also subsidize employment of people who would otherwise be unemployed, or put people on benefits even although they could be working. It may be that workers are hired, but that they do nothing while at work.

On the one side, governments often try to make unemployment seem as low as possible because that is politically desirable. On the other side, governments also often provide "broader" and "narrower" measures of unemployment. For example, the United States Bureau of Labor Statistics provides six measures of labor underutilization (U-1 through U-6). The U-3 rate is the "official" unemployment rate.

== Global reserve army of labour ==
Marx was writing in the mid-19th century, and his discussion of unemployment may therefore be in part out of date, especially if one considers only particular developed countries. However, his analysis may continue to be quite valid if considered globally. The ILO reports that the proportion of jobless has been steadily increasing since the beginning of the 2008 financial crisis.

In 2007, the ILO standard global unemployment measure stood at 169.7 million. In 2012, the ILO global unemployment rate reached 5.9% of the civilian labour force (195.4 million, or a net 25.7 million more), 0.5 percentage points higher than the 5.4% rate before the 2008 financial crisis. The official global unemployment rate was expected to have risen to 6% of the civilian labour force in 2013. Over 30 million jobs were still needed to return total employment to the level that prevailed before the 2008 financial crisis. It was expected in 2013 that globally about 205 million people would be unemployed in 2014 and 214 million in 2018. However, the official total of the unemployed was subsequently (in 2017) forecast to be just over 201 million persons in that year and with an additional rise of 2.7 million expected in 2018. The official world total of unemployed in the labour force is approximately equal to the total number of employed workers in the United States, Canada and Mexico put together.

The official unemployment figures do not include jobless people who have dropped out of the labour force altogether because they can not find work as they include only those actually looking for work. The global unemployment rate is strongly influenced by population growth; the more population, the more unemployed and employed in absolute numbers. However, the proportion of jobless people now rises every year and is expected to continue rising for quite some time.

Among the world's unemployed, the ILO estimates that roughly half the global total are young people aged 15 to 24. In the rich countries, it often does not matter so much if young people are unemployed at that age, but in the Middle East, Asia, Africa and Latin America where most of the unemployed youths are it is often a much more serious problem.

== Modern academic usage ==
In recent years, there has been a growing use in Marxist and anarchist theory of the concept of "the precariat" to describe a growing reliance on temporary, part-time workers with precarious status who share aspects of the proletariat and the reserve army of labor. Precarious workers do work part-time or full-time in temporary jobs, but they cannot really earn enough to live on and depend partly on friends or family, or on state benefits, to survive. Typically, they do not become truly "unemployed", but they do not have a decent job to go to either.

Although non-employed people who are unable or uninterested in performing legal paid work are not considered among the "unemployed", the concept of "conjunctural unemployment" is used in economics nowadays. Economists often distinguish between short-term "frictional" or "cyclical" unemployment and longer-term "structural unemployment". Sometimes there is a shortterm mismatch between the demand and supply of labour, at other times there is much less total demand for labour than supply for a long time. If there is no possibility for getting a job at all in the foreseeable future, many younger people decide to emigrate to a place where they can find work.

== See also ==
- Efficiency wage
- Full employment
- Guaranteed minimum income
- Ghost job
- Involuntary unemployment
- Iron law of wages
- Phillips curve and the Natural rate of unemployment
- Shapiro–Stiglitz theory
- Job guarantee and associated concept of "buffer stock" (NAIRU, NAIBER)
- Labour supply
- Labour power
- Overproduction
- Unemployment
- Wage slavery
- Working class
