= Employer of last resort =

Least desirable employment option of workers in an economy

Employers of last resort (ELR) are employers in an economy to whom workers go for jobs when no other jobs are available; the term is by analogy with "lender of last resort". The phrase is used in two senses:

- undesirable jobs, often private sector, which are only taken as a last resort;
- a formal government job guarantee program, where the government promises to act as employer of last resort, employing all comers.

The sense of a job guarantee program is used and advocated by some schools of Post-Keynesian economists, notably by authors of Modern Monetary Theory at the University of Missouri-Kansas City, the Levy Economics Institute (both United States) and in the Centre of Full Employment and Equity (Australia), who advocate it as a solution for unemployment.

== Use ==
Colloquially, this may refer to work which is undesirable to most people or pays poorly – for instance, in the United States economy, many fast-food and retail industry jobs represent last-resort employment for many workers.

In economics, the phrase often refers to employers which can hire workers when no other employers are hiring. Their presence may soften the negative impact on employment of downturns in the business cycle. One example of such a program would be the Civilian Conservation Corps, a government agency intended to provide work to young, unemployed men. Military Keynesianism argues that the military can act as an employer of last resort, particularly when an underdeveloped geographic area experiences economic conscription.

== Government as employer of last resort ==
=== Proposals ===
A scheme was proposed by the Urban Coalition in the mid-1960s and received some support in the US Senate but was opposed by Lyndon B. Johnson.

More recently L. Randall Wray suggested a proposal for the US where workers would be subject to federal work rules, jobs would be tailored to individuals' existing skills, and the US Labor Department would assess proposals for employment and keep a central register; he estimated a total cost of 1–2% of the US's GDP. Marshall Auerback suggested the government hire all unemployed workers, paying close to the minimum wage.

=== Criticisms ===
Marshall Auerback mentioned a number of flaws which his proposal attempted to get around. Such a scheme might have an effect on wages for existing jobs. It would also potentially require a large and expensive state bureaucracy to administer.

=== Examples ===
On April 3, 2002 Argentina signed into law the social program Jefes y Jefas de Hogar Desempleados. It acts as an employer of last resort for heads of household who are unemployed and unable to find work.

== See also ==
- Dead-end job
- Full Employment Abandoned
- Involuntary unemployment
- NAIBER
- National Rural Employment Guarantee Act
- Natural rate of unemployment
