= NAIBER =

Systemic proposal for an in-built inflation control mechanism

In economics, non-accelerating inflation buffer employment ratio (NAIBER) refers to a systemic proposal for an in-built inflation control mechanism devised by economists Bill Mitchell and Warren Mosler, and advocated by Modern Money Theory as replacement for NAIRU (non-accelerating inflation rate of unemployment). The concept of NAIBER is related to the idea of a job guarantee aimed to create full employment and price stability, by having the state promise to hire unemployed workers as an employer of last resort (ELR).

== Description ==
If the Phillips curve displays hysteresis—that is, if episodes of high unemployment raise the NAIRU—the NAIRU analysis is especially problematic. This could happen, for example, if unemployed workers lose skills so that employers prefer to bid up of the wages of existing workers when demand increases, rather than hiring the unemployed. Economists as Abba Lerner and Hyman Minsky have argued that a similar effect can be achieved without the human costs of unemployment via a job guarantee, where rather than being unemployed, those who cannot find work in the private sector should be employed by the government. This theory, and the policy of the job guarantee replaces the NAIRU with the NAIBER (non-accelerating inflation buffer employment ratio).

The buffer employment ratio (BER) is the ratio of job guarantee employment to total employment. The BER conditions the overall rate of wage demands. When the BER is high, real wage demands will be correspondingly lower. If inflation exceeds the government's announced target, tighter fiscal and monetary policy would be triggered to increase the BER, which entails workers transferring from the inflating sector to the fixed price job guarantee sector. Ultimately, this reduces the inflation spiral. So instead of a buffer stock of unemployed being used to discipline the distributional struggle, the job guarantee policy achieves this via compositional shifts in employment. Replacing the current non-accelerating inflation rate of unemployment (NAIRU), the BER that results in stable inflation is called the non-accelerating inflation buffer employment ratio (NAIBER). It is a full employment steady state level, which is dependent on a range of factors, such as the path of the economy.

== See also ==
- Centre of Full Employment and Equity
- Full Employment Abandoned
- Job Guarantee
- Employer of last resort
- Involuntary unemployment
- Natural rate of unemployment
