= Underemployment equilibrium =

Economic situation

In Keynesian economics, underemployment equilibrium is a situation with a persistent shortfall relative to full employment and potential output so that unemployment is higher than at the NAIRU or the "natural" rate of unemployment.

== Theoretical framework ==
=== Origin ===
The concept of underemployment equilibrium originates from analyzing underemployment in the context of General Equilibrium Theory, a branch of microeconomics. It describes a steady economic state when consumptions and production outputs are both suboptimal – many economic agents in the economy are producing less than what they could produce in some other equilibrium states. Economic theory dictates that underemployment equilibrium possesses certain stability features under standard assumptions – the “invisible hand” (market force) can not, by itself, alter the equilibrium outcome to a more socially desirable equilibrium. Exogenous forces such as fiscal policy have to be implemented in order to drive the economy to a better state.

=== Formal definition ===
In an economy $E=((u^h,e^h )_h,(Y^f,(\theta^fh )_h )_f)$: every economic agent h has a utility function $u^h$ and an initial endowment of wealth $e^h;$ every firm f has a production function $Y^f;$ every agent’s share of firm f is $(\theta^fh )_h.$ An underemployment equilibrium, given a price vector p, is defined as the consumption-production vector $(x^*,y^* )$ such that

For every firm f, producing $y^*$ maximizes its profit
For every economic agent h, consuming $x^*$ maximizes its utility
The market clears, meaning that the sum of optimal consumptions of all agents, $\sum x^*$ , equals to the sum of their initial endowments, $\sum e^*,$ plus the sum of optimal profits for all firms, $\sum y^*.$

== Causes ==
Given a well-defined economy, there could be many stable equilibrium states – some are more desirable than others from a social welfare point of view. Many factors contribute to the existence of undesirable equilibriums, among which two are crucial for underemployment equilibrium: oversupply and insufficient demand. When the labor force are overeducated for the skill level of available employment opportunities in the economy, an underemployment equilibrium will occur. Insufficient demand addresses the same issue at the macro level. When there are many fewer job opportunities than unemployed individuals, the unemployment rate is high. Moreover, well-qualified workers will face a tougher job market and thus have to settle for jobs originally meant for less skilled individuals. “Oversupply” here refers to an excess in both labor quantity and quality.

== Forms of underemployment equilibrium ==
=== Overqualification ===
Overqualification is the most common form of underemployment equilibrium and is a direct result of oversupply. It defines the situation when individuals work in professions which require less education, skill, experience or ability than they possess. In economic terms, these agents are producing less than their socially optimal output. Collectively, when a lot of individuals produce below their full potential, the economy is in a sub-optimal underemployment equilibrium.

=== Overstaffing ===
Overstaffing refers to the state when firms or other organizations that act as employers in an economy are hiring more people than they need. This is much less common than overqualification. This redundancy invalidates unemployment rates as a signal for the existence of underemployment equilibrium. When firms are overstaffed, they can not achieve their maximum profit levels, which leads to undesirable social consequences such as low GDP growth. Organizations plagued by overstaffing, including not-for-profit organizations, cannot achieve maximum efficiency and their ability to create value according to their mission, vision and purpose will be hampered.

== Applications and historical examples ==
=== Underemployment during the Great Depression ===
During the 1930s, Great Depression, U.S. unemployment rate reached 25% and GDP growth rate fell to −13%. The U.S. economy at this period can be characterized by an underemployment equilibrium. On the one hand, many outside forces (including financial instability, hyper-inflation, lack of capital, etc.) created a negative shock to the demand of job market. On the other hand, the first two decades of the 20th century saw rapid advancement in production technologies, which effectively eliminated a large number of skilled jobs. Both of the above forces help create an insufficient demand of labor market during that time, causing an underemployment equilibrium. This particular underemployment equilibrium takes form of overqualification, characterized by high unemployment rate and low household incomes.

=== Underemployment in the aftermath of the 2008 financial crisis ===
Graduates entering the job market in 2012 faced very tough competitions, caused by an oversupply of skilled workers, including fresh graduates and people who were laid off during the 2008 financial crisis. Graduates did not have enough time to respond to the 2008 financial crisis and continued to finish their degrees, only to find that there are not enough jobs upon graduation. This underemployment equilibrium state is characterized by overqualification – many college graduates are taking positions designed for less educated individuals due to gloomy job market conditions.

== Data ==
The Bureau of Labor Statistics calculates monthly the “Underemployment Rate” starting from January, 1948. The underemployment rate has a cyclical trend and is generally higher during recession periods. Similar to the unemployment rate, the underemployment rate varies for different subgroups of the labor force. For example, individuals with Ph.Ds enjoy low underemployment rate while individuals with high school diploma or lower usually suffer from a high underemployment rate.
