= Job guarantee =

Economic policy proposal for full employment

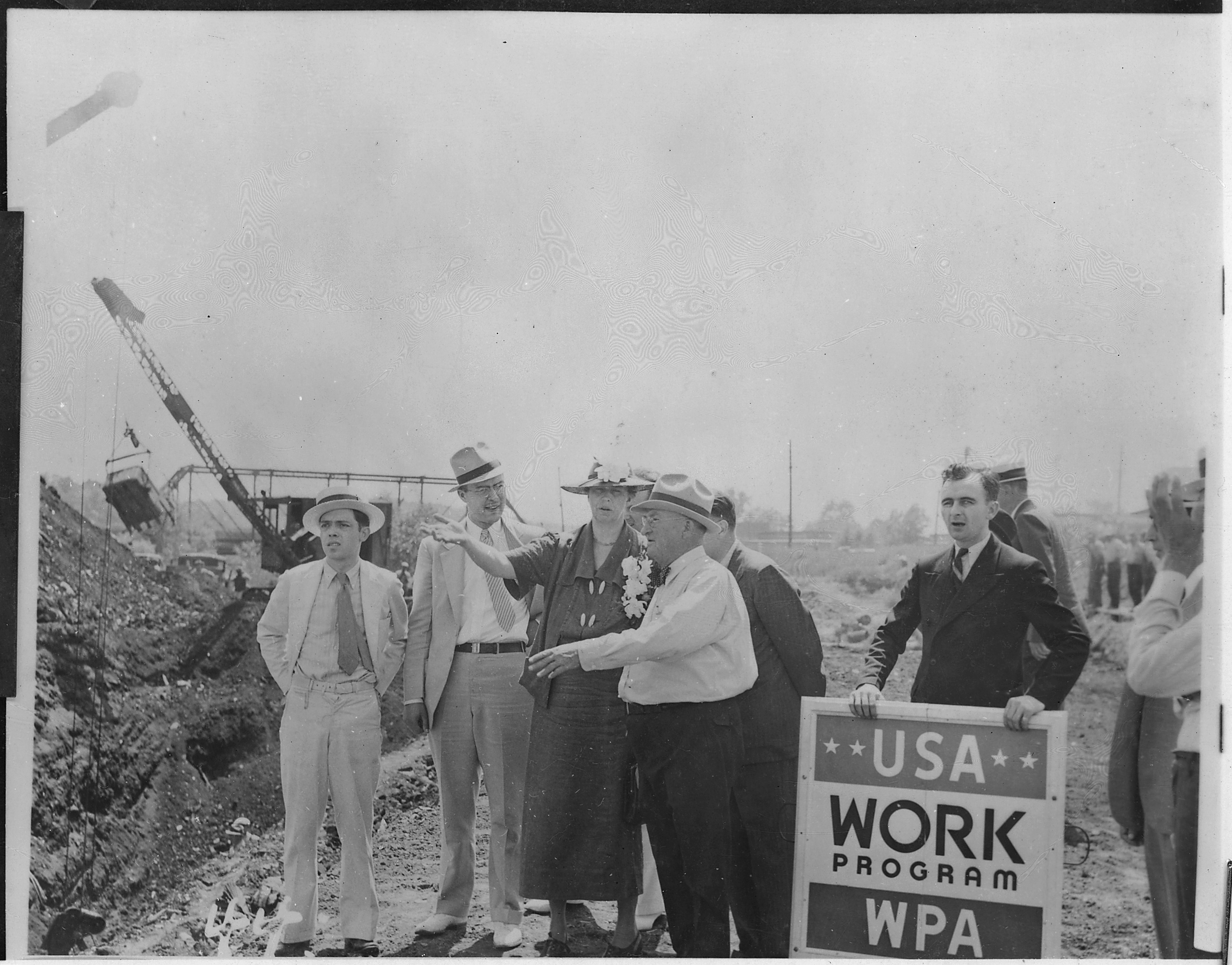
Eleanor Roosevelt onsite one of the Works Progress Administration Projects, a job guarantee program in the United States

A job guarantee is an economic policy proposal that aims to create full employment and price stability by having the state promise to hire unemployed workers as an employer of last resort (ELR). It aims to provide a sustainable solution to inflation and unemployment.

The economic policy stance currently dominant around the world uses unemployment as a policy tool to control inflation. When inflation rises, the government pursues contractionary fiscal or monetary policy, with the aim of creating a buffer stock of unemployed people, reducing wage demands, and ultimately inflation. When inflationary expectations subside, expansionary policy aims to produce the opposite effect.

By contrast, in a job guarantee program, a buffer stock of employed people (employed in the job guarantee program) is typically intended to provide the same protection against inflation without the social costs of unemployment, hence potentially fulfilling the dual mandate of full employment and price stability.

== Overview ==
A job guarantee is based on a buffer stock principle whereby the public sector offers a fixed wage job to anyone willing and able to work thereby establishing and maintaining a buffer stock of employed workers. This buffer stock expands when private sector activity declines, and declines when private sector activity expands, much like today's unemployed buffer stocks.

A job guarantee thus fulfills an absorption function to minimize the real costs associated with the flux of the private sector. When private sector employment declines, public sector employment will automatically react and increase its payrolls. So in a recession, the increase in public employment will increase net government spending, and stimulate aggregate demand and the economy. Conversely, in a boom, the decline of public sector employment and spending caused by workers leaving their job guarantee jobs for higher paid private sector employment will lessen stimulation, so the job guarantee functions as an automatic stabilizer controlling inflation. The nation always remains fully employed, with a changing mix between private and public sector employment. Since the job guarantee wage is open to everyone, it will functionally become the national minimum wage.

Under a job guarantee, workers average 32 hours per week, choosing between full- and part-time opportunities, undertaking work of public benefit at the minimum wage, though specifics may change depending on the model. The aim is to replace unemployment and underemployment with paid employment (up to the hours desired by workers), so that those who are at any point in time surplus to the requirements of the private sector (and mainstream public sector) can earn a wage rather than be underemployed or suffer poverty and social exclusion.

The unemployed could choose between unemployment insurance payments or a job guarantee. One-Stop Job Centers would serve as public job banks, where community organizations accept trainees until more a appropriate work opportunity is found.^{:44}

Job guarantee theory is often associated with certain post-Keynesian economists, particularly at the Centre of Full Employment and Equity (University of Newcastle, Australia), at the Levy Economics Institute (Bard College), and at University of Missouri – Kansas City including the affiliated Center for Full Employment and Price Stability.

One theory was put forward by Hyman Minsky in 1965. Notable job guarantee theories were conceived independently by Bill Mitchell (1998), and Warren Mosler (1997–98). This work was then developed further by L. Randall Wray (1998). A comprehensive treatment of it appears in Mitchell and Muysken (2008).

== Inflation control ==
A fixed job guarantee wage provides an in-built inflation control mechanism. Mitchell (1998) called the ratio of job guarantee employment to total employment the buffer employment ratio (BER). The BER conditions the overall rate of wage demands. When the BER is high, real wage demands will be correspondingly lower. If inflation exceeds the government's announced target, tighter fiscal and monetary policy would be triggered to increase the BER, which entails workers transferring from the inflating sector to the fixed price job guarantee sector. Ultimately this attenuates the inflation spiral. So instead of a buffer stock of unemployed being used to discipline the distributional struggle, a job guarantee policy achieves this via compositional shifts in employment.

Replacing the currently widely-used measure the non-accelerating inflation rate of unemployment (NAIRU), the BER that results in stable inflation is called the non-accelerating inflation buffer employment ratio (NAIBER). It is a full employment steady state job guarantee level, which is dependent on a range of factors including the path of the economy. There is an issue about the validity of an unchanging nominal anchor in an inflationary environment. Unlike unemployed labor, job guarantee workers retain and acquire skills, increasing labor force productivity and minimum wage. Its viability as a nominal anchor relies on the fiscal authorities reining in any private wage-price pressures.

=== No relative wage effects ===
Mitchell and Muysken believe that a job guarantee introduces no relative wage effects and the rising demand does not necessarily invoke inflationary pressures because it is, by definition, satisfying the net savings desire of the private sector. Additionally, in today's demand constrained economies, firms are likely to increase capacity utilisation to meet the higher sales volumes. Given that the demand impulse is less than required in the NAIRU economy, if there were any demand-pull inflation it would be lower under a job guarantee. There are no new problems faced by employers who wish to hire labour to meet the higher sales levels. Any initial rise in demand will stimulate private sector employment growth while reducing job guarantee employment and spending. However, these demand pressures are unlikely to lead to accelerating inflation while the job guarantee pool contains workers employable by the private sector.

=== Wage bargaining ===
While a job guarantee policy frees wage bargaining from the general threat of unemployment, several factors offset this:

- In professional occupational markets, any unemployment will generate downwards pressure on wages. However, eventually the stock of unemployed professionals will be exhausted, whereupon upward wage-price pressures can be expected to develop. With a strong and responsive tertiary education sector, skill bottlenecks can be avoided more readily than with an unemployed buffer stock;
- Private firms would still be required to train new workers in job-specific skills in the same way they would in a non-Job Guarantee economy. However, job guarantee workers are far more likely to have retained higher levels of skill than those who are forced to succumb to lengthy spells of unemployment. This changes the bargaining environment rather significantly because firms now have reduced hiring costs. Previously, the same firms would have lowered their hiring standards and provided on-the-job training and vestibule training in tight labour markets. A job guarantee policy thus reduces the "hysteretic inertia" embodied in the long-term unemployed and allows for a smoother private sector expansion;
- With high long-term unemployment, the excess supply of labour poses a very weak threat to wage bargaining, compared to a job guarantee environment.

== List of job guarantee programs ==
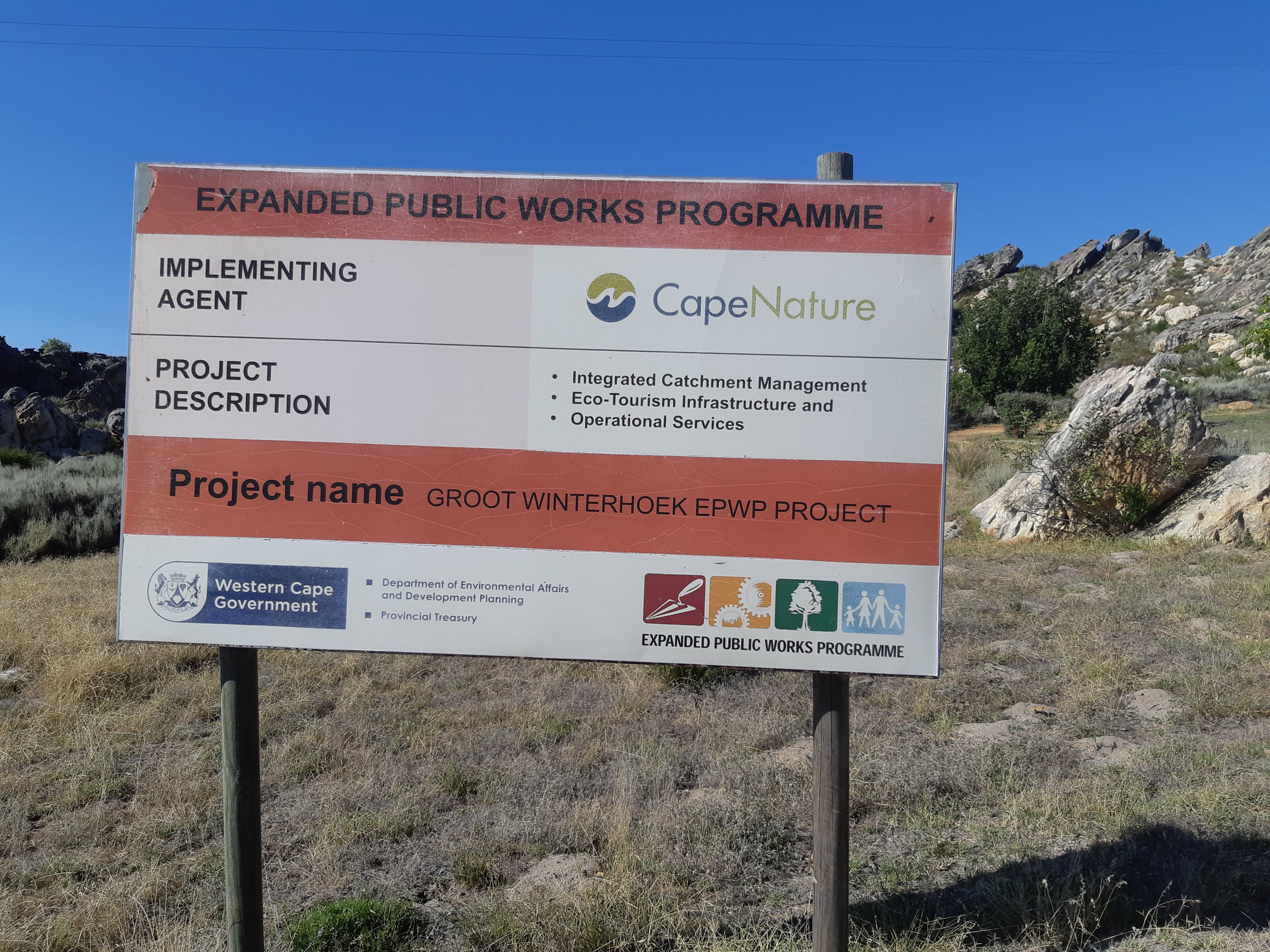
A billboard informing the public of the presence of Expanded Public Works Programme (EPWP) workers employed at the Groot Winterhoek Wilderness Area. The EPWP is an attempt by government to alleviate South Africa's unemployment crisis.

=== Programs for adults ===
- 1848 – The first governmentally guaranteed work program was implemented by the Parisian government in France through the National Workshops which took place from February to June 1848.
- 1928–1991 – Citizens of the USSR were guaranteed the right to employment, and unemployment vanished in 1930. A job guarantee was included in its 1936 constitution, and was given further prominence in the 1977 revision. Later communist states followed this lead.
- 1935–1943 – In the United States from 1935 to 1943, the Works Progress Administration aimed to ensure one paid job for all families whose breadwinners suffered long-term unemployment. Full employment was achieved by 1942 due to World War II, which led to the ending of the organisation the following year.
- 1945 – From 1945, the Australian government was committed to full employment through the position established by the White Paper Full Employment in Australia, however this never included a formal job guarantee. The Reserve Bank Act 1959 charges the Reserve Bank of Australia with ensuring full employment, amongst other duties. The Australian government's definition of "full employment" changes with the adoption of the NAIRU concept in the late 1970s, with the government now aiming to keep a sufficient proportion of people unemployed to stop low-unemployment-related inflation.
- 1946 – The original drafters of the US Employment Act of 1946 intended for it to mandate full employment, however Congress ultimately gave it a broader pro-employment nature.
- 1948 – The UN's Universal Declaration of Human Rights' Article 23 includes "Everyone has the right to work, to free choice of employment, to just and favourable conditions of work and to protection against unemployment." It is ratified by most non-socialist countries.
- 1949–1997 – In the People's Republic of China from 1949 to 1997, the "iron rice bowl" practice guaranteed employment for its citizens.
- 1978 – The US Humphrey-Hawkins Full Employment Act of 1978 authorized the government to create a "reservoir of public employment" in case private enterprise does not provide sufficient jobs. These jobs are mainly to be in the lower ranges of skill and pay so as to not draw the workforce away from the private sector. However, the act did not establish such a reservoir (it only authorized it), and no such program has been implemented, even though the unemployment rate has generally been above the rate (3%) targeted by the act.
- 1998–2010 – The United Kingdom's New Deal was similar to Australia's Work for the Dole scheme, though more focused on young people. It was in place from 1998 to 2010.
- 2001 – The Argentine government introduced the Jefes de Hogar (Heads of Households) program in 2001 to combat the social malaise that followed the financial crisis in that year.
- 2003 – The South African government conceptualized the Expanded Public Works Programme (EPWP) in 2003 to overcome the rising unemployment and reduce poverty. EPWP planned to create 1 million jobs in 5 years.
- 2005 – Similarly, the government of India in 2005 introduced a five-year plan called the National Rural Employment Guarantee Act (NREGA) to bridge the vast rural–urban income disparities that have emerged as India's information technology sector has boomed. The program successfully empowered women and raised rural wages, but also attracted the ire of landowners who have to pay farm labourers more due to a higher prevailing wage. NREGA projects tend to be highly labour-intensive and low skill, like dam and road construction, and soil conservation, with modest but positive long-term benefits and mediocre management.
- 2020 – The Public Employment Service (AMS) in Austria in cooperation with University of Oxford economists Maximilian Kasy and Lukas Lehner started a job guarantee pilot in the municipality of Gramatneusiedl (Marienthal). The project's site became famous a century earlier through a landmark study in empirical social research when Marie Jahoda, Paul Lazarsfeld and Hans Zeisel studied the consequences of mass unemployment on a community in the wake of the Great Depression. The current job guarantee pilot returned to the site to study the opposite: what happens when unemployed people are guaranteed a job? The program offers jobs to every unemployed job seeker who has been without a paid job for more than a year. Most of the long-term jobless were placed in non-profit training companies tasked with repairing second-hand furniture, renovating housing, public gardening, and similar jobs. The pilot eliminated long-term unemployment – an important result, given the programme’s entirely voluntary nature. Participants’ gained greater financial security, improved their psycho-social stability and social inclusion. The study drew international attention and informed policy reports by the EU, OECD, UN, and ILO. The program ended in 2024 and served as the basis for the European Commission's Social Fund + (ESF+) to provide 23 million EUR for further job guarantee pilots across Europe.
- 2020-21 – Australia's second most populous state of Victoria provided a $500 million (AUD) limited job guarantee in 2020-21 for up to 15,000 Victorians in response to COVID-19. The investment from the Victorian state government provided grants primarily to public and not-for-profit sector employers to create additional jobs. The jobs were paid at public sector employee entry-level wage rates. An evaluation of the initiative in May 2021 by Deloitte found a cost-benefit ratio above 1, even though a large portion of benefits were accrued by the Australian federal government rather than Victoria. The total boost to Victorian Gross State Product was estimated at $911 million, with broader socioeconomic benefits (i.e. less crime, better health) estimated to be about $110 million. If benefits were viewed at a whole-of-government (federal and state combined) level, the cost-benefit ratio was estimated to be $4 in benefits for every $1 invested. The program resulted in 11,811 jobs (as at May 2021), prevented 1,400 workers from becoming long-term unemployed, and lifted labour supply by 360 workers. Roles were created in infrastructure, social work, environmental care and more. On average, workers received $22,394 in extra income and of the participants surveyed for the evaluation:
  - 87% said their financial security improved
  - 83% said their personal confidence improved
  - 62% said their physical health improved
  - 79% said they gained useful skills
  - 79% also said the work prevented a resume gap
- 2030 – In 2021, a report released by California governor Gavin Newsom's Future of Work Commission called for a job guarantee program in California by 2030.

=== Programs for youth ===
- The European Youth Guarantee is a commitment by European Union member states to "guarantee that all young people under the age of 25 receive, within four months of becoming unemployed or leaving formal education, a good quality work offer to match their skills and experience; or the chance to continue their studies or undertake an apprenticeship or professional traineeship." The committed countries agreed to start implementing this in 2014. Since 2014, each year more than 3.5 million young people registered in the program accepted an offer of employment, continued education, a traineeship or an apprenticeship. Correspondingly, youth unemployment in the EU has decreased from a peak of 24% in 2013 to 13.9% by 2023.
- Sweden first implemented a similar guarantee in 1984, with fellow Nordic countries Norway (1993), Denmark (1996) and Finland (1996) following. Later, some additional European countries also offered this as well, prior to the EU wide adoption.
- Germany and many Nordic countries have long had civil and military conscription programs for young people, which requires or gives them the option to do low-paid work for a government body for up to 12 months. This was also the case in the Netherlands until 1997. It was also the case in France, and that country is reintroducing a similar program from 2021.
- Bhutan runs a Guaranteed Employment Program for youth.

== Advocacy ==
The Labour Party under Ed Miliband went into the 2015 UK general election with a promise to implement a limited job guarantee (specifically, part-time jobs with guaranteed training included for long-term unemployed youth) if elected; however, they lost the election.

Bernie Sanders supports a federal jobs guarantee for the United States and Alexandria Ocasio-Cortez included a jobs-guarantee program as one of her campaign pledges when she ran for, and won, her seat in the U.S. House of Representatives in 2018.

In Australia, Unionists for Job Guarantee have been advocating since 2024 with some successes. The group submitted a detailed budget proposal to the Australian federal government in 2026, highlighting a potential return on benefit of $4 for every $1 invested by government. The proposal also noted that the second most populous state of Victoria successfully provided a $500 million (AUD) limited job guarantee in 2020-21 for up to 15,000 Victorians in response to COVID-19.

== Criticism ==
Economist Malcolm Sawyer identifies four major shortcomings in job guarantee proposals. First, if the jobs provided are socially useful, they should be organized on a permanent basis according to social need rather than fluctuate with private-sector demand. Second, because such jobs would have to be paid at or below the minimum wage, they could put downward pressure on comparable public-sector wages while still being preferable to insecure or insufficient private-sector employment. Third, the programme could undermine mainstream public employment by encouraging the substitution of regular public jobs with minimum-wage job-guarantee positions. Fourth, the programme would require productive capacity in the right quantities and places to employ people who would otherwise be unemployed, which Sawyer regards as a significant practical constraint.

== See also ==
- Centre of Full Employment and Equity
- Chartalism
- Full Employment Abandoned
- Flexicurity
- Guaranteed minimum income
- Involuntary unemployment
- Job security
- Modern Monetary Theory
- National Rural Employment Guarantee Act
- Natural rate of unemployment
- Non-accelerating inflation buffer employment ratio
- Kurzarbeit
- Public employment service
- Universal inheritance
