= Hytten =

Hytten is a surname. Notable people with the surname include:

- Mario Hytten (born 1955), Swedish-born former racing driver who raced predominantly under a Swiss license; sports promoter and sponsorship specialist
- Olaf Hytten (1888–1955), Scottish actor
- Torleiv Hytten (1890–1980), Norwegian-Australian economist
