= Coordination failure (economics) =

Game theoretic outcome

In economics, coordination failure is a concept that can explain recessions through the failure of firms and other price setters to coordinate. In an economic system with multiple equilibria, coordination failure occurs when a group of firms could achieve a more desirable equilibrium but fail to because they do not coordinate their decision making. Coordination failure can result in a self-fulfilling prophecy. For example, if one firm decides a recession is imminent and fires its workers, other firms might lose demand from the lay-offs and respond by firing their own workers leading to a recession at a new equilibrium. Coordination failure can also be associated with sunspot equilibria (where equilibria are the result of variables that do not have any real impact on fundamentals) and animal spirits.

Coordination failure can lead to an underemployment equilibrium. Coordination failure also implies that fiscal policy can mitigate the effects of recessions, or even avoid them entirely, by moving the economy to a higher-output equilibrium.

In game theory, coordination failure can also be analyzed by focal point (game theory). Focal points are solutions that players choose by default without the presence of communication. For example, players in a coordination game are unable to cooperate to reach mutually optimal solution without observing other players' choices and hence will only choose their best choices according to available information on hand. This will lead to a solution where players in the game gain lower payoffs than in the case of successful cooperation, and result in a coordination failure issue.

== Example ==
Example of a coordination failure

Models of coordination failure can have multiple equilibria. In this example a representative firm e_{i} makes its output decisions based on the average output of other firms (e^{*}). When the representative firm produces as much as the average firm (e_{i}=e^{*}), the economy is at an equilibrium. The curve represents possible output decisions for the individual firm, and it intersects with the 45 degree line at three points, meaning there are three equilibria. If the firm and society are better off with more output, point B is most desirable. However, the firm's production is determined by what the other firms decide. Ideally, they could all coordinate to produce at the level corresponding with the equilibrium at point B, but, if they fail to coordinate, firms might produce at a less efficient equilibrium.

In the workplace Jordi Brandts and David J. Cooper study how to overcome coordination failure in a corporate organization, where this issue arises between manager and employees. In this study, they discuss that a manager can prevent the coordination failure issue by either increasing financial incentives for his employees or communicating with the employees. They also find that the communication tool, especially clear and direct communication, is more effective than the incentive tool if the manager wants to overcome coordination failure and hence improve the employees’ performance.

== See also ==
- Diamond coconut model
- Coordination game
- Strategic complementarity
- Focal point (game theory)
