= Full employment =

Economic situation with no or low unemployment

Full employment is an economic situation in which there is no unemployment or no cyclical or deficient-demand unemployment.

The definition of full employment differs between economists. Full employment can entail the disappearance of all unemployment and a 100% employment-to-population ratio. For other economists full employment can occur even when structural and frictional unemployment remain. For instance, workers who are "between jobs" for short periods of time as they search for better employment are not counted against full employment, as such unemployment is frictional rather than cyclical. An economy with full employment might also have unemployment or underemployment where part-time workers cannot find jobs appropriate to their skill level, as such unemployment is considered structural rather than cyclical. Full employment marks the point past which expansionary fiscal and/or monetary policy cannot reduce unemployment any further without causing inflation. Other economists view full unemployment as the unemployment rate at which inflation is stable. Advocacy of avoiding accelerating inflation is based on a theory centered on the concept of the Non-Accelerating Inflation Rate of Unemployment (NAIRU) and those who hold it usually mean NAIRU when speaking of full employment. The NAIRU has also been described by Milton Friedman, among others, as the "natural" rate of unemployment. Such views tend to emphasize sustainability, noting that a government cannot sustain unemployment rates below the NAIRU forever: inflation will continue to grow so long as unemployment lies below the NAIRU.

For the United States, economist William T. Dickens found that full-employment unemployment rate varied a lot over time but equaled about 5.5 percent of the civilian labor force during the 2000s. Recently, economists have emphasized the idea that full employment represents a "range" of possible unemployment rates. For example, in 1999, in the United States, the Organisation for Economic Co-operation and Development (OECD) gives an estimate of the "full-employment unemployment rate" of 4 to 6.4%. This is the estimated unemployment rate at full employment, plus or minus the standard error of the estimate.

The concept of full employment of labor corresponds to the concept of potential output or potential real GDP and the long run aggregate supply (LRAS) curve. In neoclassical macroeconomics, the highest sustainable level of aggregate real GDP or "potential" is seen as corresponding to a vertical LRAS curve: any increase in the demand for real GDP can only lead to rising prices in the long run, while any increase in output is temporary.

== Economic concept ==
What most neoclassical economists mean by "full" employment is a rate somewhat less than 100% employment. Others, such as the late James Tobin, have been accused of disagreeing, considering full employment as 0% unemployment. However, this was not Tobin's perspective in his later work.

Some see John Maynard Keynes as attacking the existence of rates of unemployment substantially above 0%:

The Conservative belief that there is some law of nature which prevents men from being employed, that it is 'rash' to employ men, and that it is financially 'sound' to maintain a tenth of the population in idleness for an indefinite period, is crazily improbable – the sort of thing which no man could believe who had not had his head fuddled with nonsense for years and years. The objections which are raised are mostly not the objections of experience or of practical men. They are based on highly abstract theories – venerable, academic inventions, half misunderstood by those who are applying them today, and based on assumptions which are contrary to the facts… Our main task, therefore, will be to confirm the reader's instinct that what seems sensible is sensible, and what seems nonsense is nonsense.

— J. M. Keynes and H. D. Henderson in a pamphlet to support Lloyd George in the 1929 election.

Most readers would interpret this statement as referring to only cyclical, deficient-demand, or "involuntary unemployment" (discussed below) but not to unemployment existing as "full employment" (mismatch and frictional unemployment). This is because, writing in 1929, Keynes was discussing a period in which the unemployment rate had been persistently above most conceptions of what corresponds to full employment. That is, a situation where a tenth of the population (and thus a larger percentage of the labor force) is unemployed involves a disaster.

One major difference between Keynes and the Classical economists was that while the latter saw "full employment" as the normal state of affairs with a free-market economy (except for short periods of adjustment), Keynes saw the possibility of persistent aggregate-demand failure causing unemployment rates to exceed those corresponding to full employment. Put differently, while Classical economists saw all unemployment as "voluntary", Keynes saw the possibility that involuntary unemployment can exist when the demand for final products is low compared to potential output. This can be seen in his later and more serious work. In his General Theory of Employment, Interest, and Money, chapter 2, he used a definition that should be familiar to modern macroeconomics:

This state of affairs we shall describe as "full" employment, both "frictional" and "voluntary" unemployment being consistent with "full" employment thus defined.

The only difference from the usual definitions is that, as discussed below, most economists would add skill/location mismatch or structural unemployment as existing at full employment. More theoretically, Keynes had two main definitions of full employment, which he saw as equivalent. His first main definition of full employment involves the absence of involuntary unemployment:

the equality of the real wage to the marginal disutility of employment ... realistically interpreted, corresponds to the absence of "involuntary" unemployment.

Put another way, the full employment and the absence of involuntary unemployment correspond to the case where the real wage equals the marginal cost to workers of supplying labor for hire on the market (the "marginal disutility of employment"). That is, the real wage rate and the amount of employment correspond to a point on the aggregate supply curve of labor that is assumed to exist. In contrast, a situation with less than full employment and thus involuntary unemployment would have the real wage above the supply price of labor. That is, the employment situation corresponds to a point above and to the left of the aggregate supply curve of labor: the real wage would be above the point on the aggregate supply curve of labor at the current level of employment; alternatively, the level of employment would be below the point on that supply curve at the current real wage.

Second, in chapter 3, Keynes saw full employment as a situation where "a further increase in the value of the effective demand will no longer be accompanied by any increase in output."

In the previous chapter we have given a definition of full employment in terms of the behavior of labor. An alternative, though equivalent, criterion is that at which we have now arrived, namely a situation, in which aggregate employment is inelastic in response to an increase in the effective demand for its output.

This means that at and above full employment, any increase in aggregate demand and employment corresponds primarily to increases in prices rather than output. Thus, full employment of labor corresponds to potential output.

Whilst full employment is often an aim for an economy, most economists see it as more beneficial to have some level of unemployment, especially of the frictional sort. In theory, this keeps the labor market flexible, allowing room for new innovations and investment. As in the NAIRU theory, the existence of some unemployment is required to avoid accelerating inflation.

=== Uncertainty ===
Whatever the definition of full employment, it is difficult to discover exactly what unemployment rate it corresponds to. In the United States, for example, the economy saw stable inflation despite low unemployment during the late 1990s, contradicting most economists' estimates of the NAIRU.

The idea that the full-employment unemployment rate (NAIRU) is not a unique number has been seen in recent empirical research. Staiger, Stock, and Watson found that the range of possible values of the NAIRU (from 4.3 to 7.3% unemployment) was too large to be useful to macroeconomic policy-makers. Robert Eisner suggested that for 1956–1995 there was a zone from about 5% to about 10% unemployment between the low-unemployment realm of accelerating inflation and the high-unemployment realm of disinflation. In between, he found that inflation falls with falling unemployment.

== Measurement ==
For the United Kingdom, the OECD estimated the NAIRU (or structural unemployment) rate as being equal to 8.5% on average between 1988 and 1997, 5.9% between 1998 and 2007, 6.2%, 6.6%, and 6.7 in 2008, 2009, and 2010, then staying at 6.9% in 2011–2013. For the United States, they estimate it as being 5.8% on average between 1988 and 1997, 5.5% between 1998 and 2007, 5.8% in 2008, 6.0% in 2009, and then staying at 6.1% from 2010 to 2013. They also estimate the NAIRU for other countries. These calculations have been criticised as lacking any foundation in evidence.

The era after the 2007–2009 Great Recession shows the relevance of this concept, for example as seen in the United States. On the one hand, in 2013 Keynesian economists such as Paul Krugman of Princeton University see unemployment rates as too high relative to full employment and the NAIRU and thus favor increasing the aggregate demand for goods and services and thus labor in order to reduce unemployment. On the other hand, pointing to shortages of some skilled workers, some businesspeople and Classical economists suggest that the U.S. economy is already at full employment, so that any demand stimulus will lead to nothing but rising inflation rates. One example was Narayana Kocherlakota, President of the Minneapolis Federal Reserve Bank, who has since changed his mind.

== Unemployment ==
William Beveridge defined "full employment" as where the number of unemployed workers equaled the number of job vacancies available (while preferring that the economy be kept above that full employment level in order to allow maximum economic production).

This definition allows for certain kinds of unemployment, where the number of unemployed workers equals the number of vacancies. Unemployment of this kind can take two forms: frictional and structural. Frictional unemployment is where the unemployed are searching for the best possible jobs whilst employers are also searching for the best possible employees to fulfil those jobs. Structural unemployment exists when the skills and geographical locations of the unemployed workers do not correspond to the skill requirements and locations of the vacancies. In either case, there exists a job for every worker, and a worker for every job.

An economy with less than full employment in Beveridge's sense will have either classical unemployment, cyclical unemployment, or both. Classical unemployment results from the actual real wage rising above the equilibrium real wage, so that the quantity of labor demanded (and the number of vacancies) is less than the quantity of labor supplied (and the number of unemployed workers). This might occur because of inefficient interference in the market; for example, a minimum wage set above the equilibrium wage; but also because of market failure, such as that caused by cartels.

Under classical unemployment, the ways by which a return to Beveridge full employment can occur depend on the nature of the rise in wages- if it is only "nominal" wages that are rigid (failing to return to equilibrium), then real wages can decrease if prices rise relative to the rigid nominal wages. If nominal wages track price levels, however, then changes to prices will not affect the real wage- and thus employment will remain below Beveridge full employment.

Cyclical, deficient-demand, or Keynesian unemployment occurs when there is not enough aggregate demand in the economy to provide jobs for everyone who wants to work. If demand for most goods and services falls, less production is needed and consequently fewer workers are needed: if wages are sticky and do not fall to meet the new equilibrium level, unemployment results, because (as with classical unemployment) there are more prospective workers than there are vacancies.

== Relation to inflation ==
The theories behind the Phillips curve point to the inflationary costs of lowering the unemployment rate. That is, as unemployment rates fell and the economy approached full employment, the inflation rate would rise. But this theory also says that there is no single unemployment number that one can point to as the "full employment" rate. Instead, there is a trade-off between unemployment and inflation: a government might choose to attain a lower unemployment rate but would pay for it with higher inflation rates. In essence, in this view, the meaning of "full employment" is really nothing but a matter of opinion based on how the benefits of lowering the unemployment rate compare to the costs of raising the inflation rate.

Though their theory had been proposed by the Keynesian economist Abba Lerner several years before, it was the work of Milton Friedman, leader of the monetarist school of economics, and Edmund Phelps that ended the popularity of this concept of full employment. In 1968, Friedman posited the theory that full employment rate of unemployment was unique at any given time. He called it the "natural" rate of unemployment. Instead of being a matter of opinion and normative judgment, it is something we are stuck with, even if it is unknown. As discussed further, below, inflation/unemployment trade-offs cannot be relied upon. Further, rather than trying to attain full employment, Friedman argues that policy-makers should try to keep prices stable (meaning a low or even a zero inflation rate). If this policy is sustained, he suggests that a free-market economy will gravitate to the "natural" rate of unemployment automatically.

=== NAIRU ===
Phillips Curve before and after Expansionary Policy, with Long-Run Phillips Curve (NAIRU)

In an effort to avoid the normative connotations of the word "natural", James Tobin (following the lead of Franco Modigliani), introduced the term the "non-accelerating inflation rate of unemployment" (NAIRU), which corresponds to the situation where the real gross domestic product equals potential output. It has been called the "inflation threshold" unemployment rate or the inflation barrier. This concept is identical to Milton Friedman's concept of the "natural" rate but reflects the fact that there is nothing "natural" about an economy. The level of the NAIRU depends on the degree of "supply side" unemployment, i.e., joblessness that can't be abolished by high demand. This includes frictional, mismatch, and Classical unemployment. When the actual unemployment rate equals the NAIRU, there is no cyclical or deficient-demand unemployment. That is, Keynes' involuntary unemployment does not exist.

To understand this concept, start with the actual unemployment equal to the NAIRU. Then, assume that a country's government and its central bank use demand-side policy to reduce the unemployment rate and then attempt to keep the rate at a specific low level: rising budget deficits or falling interest rates increase aggregate demand and raise employment of labor. Thus, the actual unemployment rate falls, as going from point A to B in the nearby graph. Unemployment then stays below the NAIRU for years or more, as at point B. In this situation, the theory behind the NAIRU posits that inflation will accelerate, i.e. get worse and worse (in the absence of wage and price controls). As the short-run Phillips curve theory indicates, higher inflation rate results from low unemployment. That is, in terms of the "trade-off" theory, low unemployment can be "bought", paid for by suffering from higher inflation. But the NAIRU theory says that this is not the whole story, so that the trade-off breaks down: a persistently higher inflation rate is eventually incorporated as higher inflationary expectations. Then, if workers and employers expect higher inflation, it results in higher inflation, as higher money wages are passed on to consumers as higher prices. This causes the short run Phillips curve to shift to the right and upward, worsening the trade-off between inflation and unemployment. At a given unemployment rate, inflation accelerates. But if the unemployment rate rises to equal the NAIRU, we see higher inflation than before the expansionary policies, as at point C in the nearby diagram. The fall of the unemployment rate was temporary because it could not be sustained. In sum, the trade-off between inflation and unemployment cannot be relied upon to be stable: taking advantage of it causes it to disappear. This story fits the experience of the United States during the late 1960s, during which unemployment rates stayed low (below 4% of the civilian labor force) and inflation rates rose significantly.

Second, examine the other main case. Again start with the unemployment rate equal to the NAIRU. Then, either shrinking government budget deficits (or rising government surpluses) or rising real interest rates encourage higher unemployment. In this situation, the NAIRU theory says that inflation will get better (decelerate) if unemployment rates exceed the NAIRU for a long time. High unemployment leads to lower inflation, which in turn causes lower inflationary expectations and a further round of lower inflation. High unemployment causes the short-run inflation/unemployment trade-off to improve. This story fits the experience of the United States during the early 1980s (Paul Volcker's war against inflation), during which unemployment rates stayed high (at about 10% of the civilian labor force) and inflation rates fell significantly.

Finally, the NAIRU theory says that the inflation rate does not rise or fall when the unemployment equals the "natural" rate. This is where the term NAIRU is derived. In macroeconomics, the case where the actual unemployment rate equals the NAIRU is seen as the long-run equilibrium because there are no forces inside the normal workings of the economy that cause the inflation rate to rise or fall. The NAIRU corresponds to the long-run Phillips curve. While the short-run Phillips curve is based on a constant rate of inflationary expectations, the long-run Phillips curve reflects full adjustment of inflationary expectations to the actual experience of inflation in the economy.

As mentioned above, Abba Lerner had developed a version of the NAIRU before the modern "natural" rate or NAIRU theories were developed. Unlike the currently dominant view, Lerner saw a range of "full employment" unemployment rates. Crucially, the unemployment rate depended on the economy's institution. Lerner distinguished between "high" full employment, which was the lowest sustainable unemployment under incomes policies, and "low" full employment, i.e., the lowest sustainable unemployment rate without these policies.

Further, it is possible that the value of the NAIRU depends on government policy, rather than being "natural" and unvarying. A government can attempt to make people "employable" by both positive means (e.g. using training courses) and negative means (e.g. cuts in unemployment insurance benefits). These policies do not necessarily create full employment. Instead, the point is to reduces the amount of mismatch unemployment by facilitating the linking of unemployed workers with the available jobs by training them and or subsidizing their moving to the geographic location of the jobs.

In addition, the hysteresis hypothesis says that the NAIRU does not stay the same over time—and can change due to economic policy. A persistently low unemployment rate makes it easier for those workers who are unemployed for "mismatch" reasons to move to where the jobs are and/or to attain the training necessary for the available vacancies (often by getting those jobs and receiving on-the-job training). On the other hand, high unemployment makes it more difficult for those workers to adjust, while hurting their morale, job-seeking skills, and the value of their work skills. Thus, some economists argue that British Prime Minister Margaret Thatcher's anti-inflation policies using persistently high unemployment led to higher mismatch or structural unemployment and a higher NAIRU.

== Policy ==
The active pursuit of national full employment through interventionist government policies is associated with Keynesian economics and marked the postwar agenda of many Western nations, until the stagflation of the 1970s. Interventionist full employment policies, targeted especially at young people, remain in place in the Nordic countries. A commitment to full employment was also restored in the United Kingdom under New Labour (1997–2010), which manifested in the New Deal which lasted from 1998 until 2010.

=== Australia ===
In 1945, the government of Australian Labor Party Prime Minister John Curtin submitted to the Parliament of Australia the white paper Full Employment in Australia; full employment remained the government's policy until 1975.

=== United States ===
As economics supplanted political economy, the meaning of full employment shifted from decent jobs for all to a macroeconomic variable of unemployment. The United States is, as a statutory matter, committed to full employment; the government is empowered to effect this goal. The relevant legislation is the Employment Act (1946), initially the "Full Employment Act," later amended in the Full Employment and Balanced Growth Act (1978). The 1946 act was passed in the aftermath of World War II, when it was feared that demobilization would result in a depression, as it had following World War I in the Recession of 1920–21, while the 1978 act was passed following the 1973–75 recession and in the midst of continuing high inflation.

The law states that full employment is one of four economic goals, in concert with growth in production, price stability, balance of trade, and budget, and that the US shall rely primarily on private enterprise to achieve these goals. Specifically, the Act is committed to an unemployment rate of no more than 3% for persons aged 20 or over, and not more than 4% for persons aged 16 or over (from 1983 onwards), and the Act expressly allows (but does not require) the government to create a "reservoir of public employment" to affect this level of employment. These jobs are required to be in the lower ranges of skill and pay so as to not draw the workforce away from the private sector.

However, since the passage of this Act in 1978, the US has, as of 2017, only briefly achieved this level of employment on the national level in the late 1990s, though some states have neared it or met it, nor has such a reservoir of public employment been created.

=== Post-Keynesian policy ===
Post-Keynesian economists have suggested ensuring full employment via a job guarantee program, where those who are unable to find work in the private sector are employed by the government, the stock of thus employed public sector workers fulfilling the same function as the unemployed do in controlling inflation, without the human costs of unemployment.

== See also ==
- Employment
- Employment Policy Convention, 1964
- Frisch elasticity of labor supply
- Job security
- Labour (economics)
- List of sovereign states by employment rate
- NAIBER
- Natural rate of unemployment
- Unemployment
  - Graduate unemployment
  - Youth unemployment

== External sources ==
- The OECD on measuring the NAIRU
- Devine, James. 2004. The "Natural" Rate of Unemployment. In Edward Fullbrook, ed., A Guide to What's Wrong with Economics, London, UK: Anthem Press, 126–32.
- Eisner, Robert. 1997. A New View of the NAIRU. In Paul Davidson and Jan A. Kregel, eds. Improving the Global Economy. Cheltenham, UK: Edgar Elgar, 1997.
- Friedman, Milton. 1968. The Role of Monetary Policy. American Economic Review. 58(1) March: 1-21.
- McConnell, Brue, and Flynn. Microeconomics 19th edition. 2012.
- Staiger, Douglas, James H. Stock, and Mark W. Watson. 1997. The NAIRU, Unemployment and Monetary Policy. Journal of Economic Perspectives. 11(1) Winter: 33–49.
