= Full Employment Abandoned =

2008 book by William Mitchell & Joan Muysken

Full Employment Abandoned: Shifting Sands and Policy Failures
- Author: Bill Mitchell, Joan Muysken
- Language: English
- Genre: Economics, macroeconomics, fiscal policy, unemployment
- Publisher: Edward Elgar Publishing
- Publication date: 2008
- Publication place: United Kingdom
- Pages: 298
- ISBN: 978-1-85898-507-7

Full Employment Abandoned: Shifting Sands and Policy Failures is a book on macroeconomic issues written by economists Bill Mitchell and Joan Muysken and first published in 2008.

== Authors ==
Australian Bill Mitchell is currently professor of economics at the University of Newcastle, New South Wales, Australia, and an originator of Modern Monetary Theory. Dutch Joan Muysken is currently professor of economics at the Faculty of Economics and Business Administration, Maastricht University, Netherlands, where he teaches macroeconomics and labour economics. They are both post-Keynesian economists.

== Table of contents ==
Part I Full Employment. Changing Views and Policies

1. The Full Employment Framework and its Demise
2. Early Views on Unemployment and the Phillips Curve
3. The Phillips Curve and Shifting Views on Unemployment
4. The Troublesome NAIRU: The Hoax that Undermined Full Employment

Part II Full Employment Abandoned. Shifting Sands and Policy Failures

5. The Shift to Full Employability
6. Inflation First: The New Mantra of Macroeconomics
7. The Neglected Role of Aggregate Demand

Part III The Urgency of Full Employment. Foundations for an Active Policy

8. A Monetary Framework for Fiscal Policy Activism
9. Buffer Stocks and Price Stability
10. Conclusion: The Urgency of Full Employment

== Publishing ==
The book was first printed and distributed in hardcover by British publishers Edward Elgar Publishing Inc. in 2008. There has been no paperback edition yet.

== Reception ==
Reviews were generally positive. Economist and fund manager Warren Mosler, reviewing Full Employment Abandoned on the Amazon.com website, wrote that "those...not all that interested in the details of unemployment per se" should turn to Part III, "which outlines the imperatives of non convertible currency."

Philip Arestis, professor of economics at Cambridge University, UK, wrote that the book "argues persuasively that macroeconomic policy has been restrictive over the recent, and not so recent past, and has produced substantial open and disguised unemployment."

L. Randall Wray, professor of economics at the University of Missouri–Kansas City, USA, also a post-Keynesian economist, like Mosler, Arestis and the two authors, notes that while "orthodoxy only calls for greater market flexibility, less government intrusion, more individual responsibility, and —perhaps— a small role for positive action to promote education, training, and innovation," this book demonstrates "it wasn't always so." Wray writes that "Milton Friedman’s insertion of expectations overturned the textbook variety of Keynesianism, returning macroeconomics to its neoclassical, pre-Depression roots. What could be added is that Friedman cleverly reversed causality, from the Keynesian view that excess demand causes inflation to the now dominant claim that inflation reduces aggregate activity below equilibrium." He claims that Full Employment Abandoned "demonstrates that neither empirical evidence nor rigorous theory supports the theologically-infused consensus about benefits of low inflation and of the possibility of using monetary policy to get there."

Professor Philip Lawn, of Flinders University, Adelaide, Australia reviewed the book for the International Journal of Environment, Workplace and Employment and wrote that it "convincingly demonstrates that unemployment is both morally indefensible and unnecessary."

Other reviewers and academics have argued against the notion of Job Guarantee advanced by the book. Malcolm Sawyer, Professor Emeritus of Economics, Leeds University, pointed out that "should unemployment fall below some ‘natural’ level, inflation [would] accelerate," and disputes the JG costs estimates as "too modest."

== Full style ==
- Mitchell, William & Joan Muysken: Full Employment Abandoned: Shifting Sands and Policy Failures (2008), Edward Elgar Publishing, 298 pp, Hardback, ISBN 978-1-85898-507-7

== See also ==
- Unemployment
- NAIRU
- Modern Monetary Theory
- Chartalism
- Job guarantee
- Government accounting
- Balanced budget
