= Torleiv Hytten =

Norwegian-Australian economist (1890–1980)

Torleiv Hytten CMG
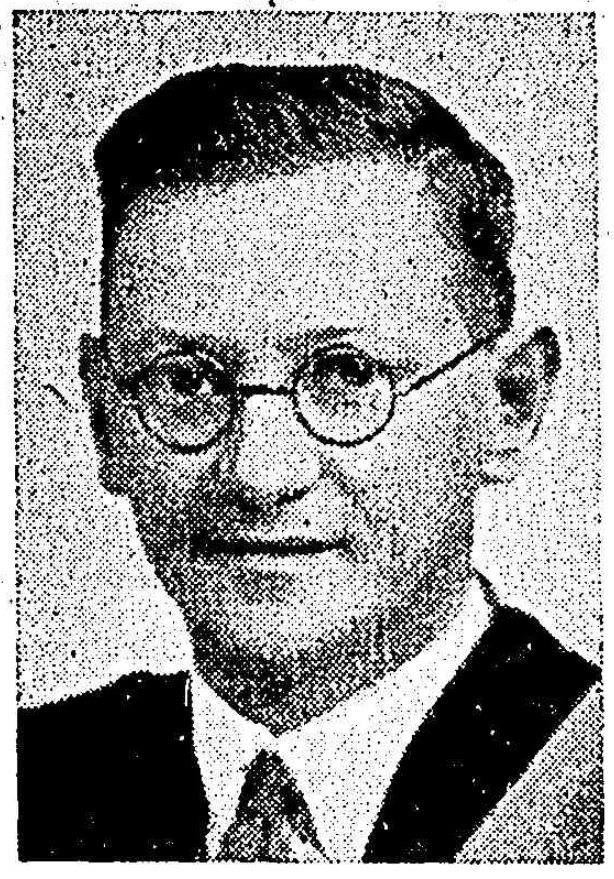
- Hytten c. 1935
- Born: 17 February 1890; Drammen, Norway
- Died: 2 January 1980 (aged 89); Aberdeen, Scotland
- Occupation: Economist
- Spouse: Margaret Compton (m. 1922)

Academic background
- Education: University of Tasmania

Academic work
- Institutions: University of Tasmania

Torleiv Hytten CMG (17 February 1890 – 2 January 1980) was a Norwegian-Australian economist and university administrator. He served as vice-chancellor of the University of Tasmania from 1949 to 1957. He was previously an economic adviser to the Government of Tasmania and the Bank of New South Wales.

== Early life ==
Hytten was born on 17 February 1890 in Drammen, Norway. He was one of nine surviving children born to Marie Charlotte (née Knudsen) and Oscar Emil Hytten. His father was a master shoemaker.

Hytten was raised in poverty. He was educated in Tønsberg, but left school at a young age due to his family's financial situation.

=== First years in Australia ===
Hytten immigrated to Australia in 1910, initially settling in New South Wales and working for periods as a labourer in Newcastle, at a ship chandler in Sydney, and as a truck driver in Broken Hill. He lived in Broken Hill between 1913 and 1918, where he was active in trade unions and attended Workers' Educational Association (WEA) sessions. He was influenced by WEA lecturer Herbert Heaton and began writing for local newspapers.

In 1918, Hytten moved to Tasmania and found work in the mining districts on the West Coast, also writing for the Zeehan & Dundas Herald. He kept in touch with Heaton and soon moved to Hobart where he became secretary of the local branch of the WEA and worked as a journalist for The World and the short-lived News. He was the chief leader writer for the News on foreign affairs.

Hytten graduated Bachelor of Arts at the University of Tasmania in 1922 and was naturalised as a British subject the following year.

== Career ==
=== Academia ===
In 1926, Hytten was appointed as a temporary lecturer at the University of Tasmania. He completed a Master of Arts in 1929 with a thesis on transport economics. He was a protégé of Douglas Copland and succeeded Copeland as professor of economics in 1930. He was also influenced by his colleagues Lyndhurst Giblin and Jim Brigden.

Resigning in 1935 to move to the private sector, Hytten returned to the University of Tasmania in August 1949. He was the first position to hold the position on a full-time basis. His tenure proved contentious and he dealt with a number of issues, including poor working conditions, low staff salaries, and delays in the planned move from The Domain to a new campus at Sandy Bay. Hytten was ultimately responsible for the controversial dismissal of philosophy professor Sydney Sparkes Orr on grounds of sexual impropriety in 1956, although he claimed to have been forced in to the dismissal by the university's council. He had a close relationship with university chancellor John Morris, but was viewed as out of touch by staff and students. A royal commission into the Orr case was critical of his actions and he resigned as vice-chancellor in 1957.

=== Government and banking work ===
Hytten served as an economic adviser to the Government of Tasmania from 1929 to 1935. He gave evidence on Tasmania's evidence before federal bodies during the Great Depression, including the Joint Committee on Public Accounts and the Commonwealth Grants Commission. Initially appointed by Nationalist premier John McPhee, he subsequently worked closely with Australian Labor Party (ALP) premier Albert Ogilvie. In 1935 he was chosen to represent Tasmania at the Silver Jubilee of George V, along with Ogilvie and Frank Gaha. The three subsequently toured Nazi Germany and Soviet Russia, reportedly the first such official delegation from any Australian government to visit the Soviet Union.

In 1935, Hytten joined the Bank of New South Wales as an economic adviser, remaining with the bank until 1949. In that year he reportedly oversaw a staff of eight researches in the bank's economic department. He opposed the Chifley government's attempts at bank nationalisation, which were overturned by the High Court in Bank of New South Wales v Commonwealth. He was a founding member of the Economic Society of Australia and served as chairman from 1933 to 1939 and from 1946 to 1947. He was later appointed by the Menzies government to the board of the Commonwealth Bank, serving from 1954 to 1959.

Hytten attracted public attention in 1949 with his comments opposing the existing bipartisan consensus on full employment, suggesting that a permanent unemployment rate of between six and eight percent would be ideal for economic stability. His comments were publicly criticised by federal government minister Herbert Evatt and appeared in ALP campaign materials in the lead-up to the 1949 federal election. In response Hytten stated that the advertisements came "close to libel" and denied any political affiliation, stating that his remarks had been in response to the White Paper on Full Employment in Australia and had been taken out of context.

== Personal life and honours ==
In 1922, Hytten married Margaret Compton, with whom he had two sons; one died in infancy. In retirement he and his wife moved to Scotland, where their son had settled. He died in Aberdeen on 2 January 1980, aged 89.

Hytten bequeathed a memoir titled To Australia With Thanks: Reminiscences of an Immigrant to the University of Tasmania, which was unpublished at the time of his death. His recollections of his fellow economists, including Brigden, Copland, Giblin and Roland Wilson, have been an important source for historians of 20th-century Australian economic thought.

Hytten was appointed a knight of Norway's Order of Saint Olav in 1951. He was also appointed Companion of the Order of St Michael and St George (CMG) in the 1953 New Year Honours. In 1959, the University of Tasmania established Hytten Hall, a male-only residential college at its new Sandy Bay campus. The college was closed in 1980 but a new residential facility of the same name was opened in Hobart's city centre in 2024.
