= Military Keynesianism =

Economic policy in which governments raise military spending to boost economic growth

Military Keynesianism is an economic policy based on the position that government should raise military spending to boost economic growth. It is a fiscal stimulus policy as advocated by John Maynard Keynes. But where Keynes advocated increasing public spending on socially useful items (infrastructure in particular), additional public spending is allocated to the arms industry, the area of defense being that over which the executive exercises greater discretionary power. This type of economy is linked to the interdependence between welfare and warfare states, in which the latter feeds the former, in a potentially unlimited spiral. The term is often used pejoratively to refer to politicians who apparently reject Keynesian economics, but use Keynesian arguments in support of excessive military spending.

== Keynesian economics and application ==
The most direct economic criticism of military Keynesianism maintains that government expenditures on non-military public goods such as health care, education, mass transit, and infrastructure repair create more jobs than equivalent military expenditures.

Noam Chomsky, a critic of military Keynesianism, contends that military Keynesianism offers the state advantages over non-military Keynesianism. Specifically, military Keynesianism can be implemented with less public interest and participation. "Social spending may well arouse public interest and participation, thus enhancing the threat of democracy; the public cares about hospitals, roads, neighborhoods, and so on, but has no opinion about the choice of missiles and high-tech fighter planes." Essentially, when the public is less interested in the details of state spending, it affords the state increased discretion in how it spends money.

=== United States ===
In the United States this theory was applied during the Second World War, during the presidencies of Franklin Delano Roosevelt and Harry Truman, the latter with the document NSC-68. The influence of Military Keynesianism on US economic policy choices lasted until the Vietnam War. Keynesians maintain that government spending should first be used for useful purposes such as infrastructure investment, but that even non-useful spending may be helpful during recessions. John Maynard Keynes advocated that government spending could be used "in the interests of peace and prosperity" instead of "war and destruction". An example of such policies are the Public Works Administration in the 1930s in the United States.

=== Keynes' 1933 letter to Roosevelt ===
In 1933, John Maynard Keynes wrote an open letter to President Franklin Roosevelt urging the new president to borrow money to be spent on public works programs.

Thus as the prime mover in the first stage of the technique of recovery I lay overwhelming emphasis on the increase of national purchasing power resulting from governmental expenditure which is financed by Loans and not by taxing present incomes. Nothing else counts in comparison with this. In a boom inflation can be caused by allowing unlimited credit to support the excited enthusiasm of business speculators. But in a slump governmental Loan expenditure is the only sure means of securing quickly a rising output at rising prices. That is why a war has always caused intense industrial activity. In the past orthodox finance has regarded a war as the only legitimate excuse for creating employment by governmental expenditure. You, Mr President, having cast off such fetters, are free to engage in the interests of peace and prosperity the technique which hitherto has only been allowed to serve the purposes of war and destruction.

=== Barney Frank ===
While the idea dates back to Keynes, a similar term is often attributed to Barney Frank, and seems to have been first used around funding the F-22 fighter:

These arguments will come from the very people who denied that the economic recovery plan created any jobs. We have a very odd economic philosophy in Washington: It’s called weaponized Keynesianism. It is the view that the government does not create jobs when it funds the building of bridges or important research or retrains workers, but when it builds airplanes that are never going to be used in combat, that is of course economic salvation.

== Forms ==
The following forms of military Keynesianism may be differentiated:

- First, there is the differentiation between the use of military spending as 'pump primer', and efforts to achieve long term multiplier effects by the given spending. A government may opt to approve the purchases of fighter planes, warships or other military commodities so as to weather a recession. Alternatively, it may opt to approve the purchase of fighter planes, warships or other military commodities throughout all the years of a given business cycle. Since the construction of large armament systems requires extensive planning and research, capitalist states generally prefer to rely on arms' purchases or other military allocations for longer-term macro-economic policymaking and regulation.
- A second differentiation that needs to be made is between primary and secondary forms of military Keynesianism. In both cases, the state uses the multiplier mechanism in order to stimulate aggregate demand in society. But the primary form of military Keynesianism refers to a situation where the state uses its military allocations as the principal means to drive the business cycle. In case of a secondary form of military Keynesianism, the given allocations contribute towards generating additional demand, but not to the extent that the economy is fully, or primarily, driven by the military allocations.
- The third differentiation starts from the observation that modern capitalist economies do not function as closed systems but rely on foreign trade and exports as outlets for the sale of a part of their surplus. This general observation applies to the surplus generated in the military sector as well. As the vast amount of data regarding state promotion of arms' exports do confirm, capitalist states actively try to ensure that their armament corporations gain access to import orders from foreign states, and they do so amongst others in order to generate multiplier effects. Hence, there is a need to also differentiate between the two forms of domestic and 'externalized' military Keynesianism.

== Permanent war economy ==
The concept of permanent war economy originated in 1944 with an article by Trotskyist Ed Sard (alias Frank Demby, Walter S. Oakes and T.N. Vance), a theoretician who predicted a post-war arms race. He argued at the time that the United States would retain the character of a war economy; even in peacetime, US military expenditure would remain large, reducing the percentage of unemployed compared to the 1930s. He extended this analysis in 1950 and 1951.

== Empirical estimates ==
Many economists have attempted to estimate the multiplier effect of military expenditures with mixed results. A meta-analysis of 42 primary studies with 243 effect size, which are aggregated results from multiple studies, found that military expenditures tend to have positive effects on economic growth in developed countries but generally negative effects on growth in less developed countries. The study attributes the negative effects to the diversion of resources from productive sectors such as education and infrastructure.

== See also ==
- Arms industry
- Bernard Baruch
- Cold War
- Countercyclical
- Employer of last resort
- Iron triangle (US politics)
- Keynesian economics
- Lemon socialism
- List of countries by military expenditures
- Military budget of the United States
- Military–industrial complex
- Parable of the broken window
- Perpetual war
- Ultra-imperialism
- War economy
