= Bill Mitchell (economist) =

Economist (born 1952)

William Mitchell
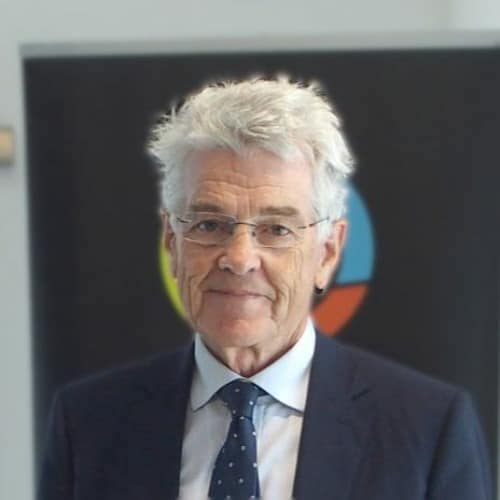
- Born: 7 March 1952 (age 74); Glen Huntly, Australia

Academic background
- Influences: Karl Marx · Michał Kalecki · Arthur Okun

Academic work
- Discipline: Modern Monetary Theory, political economy, econometrics
- School or tradition: Modern Monetary Theory
- Institutions: University of Newcastle (Australia)
- Website: billmitchell.org

William Francis Mitchell (born 7 March 1952) is an Australian economist and academic. He is a professor of economics at the University of Newcastle, New South Wales, Australia and Docent Professor of Global Political Economy at the University of Helsinki, Finland. He is also a guest professor at Kyoto University, Japan since 2022. He is one of the founding developers of Modern Monetary Theory.

== Early life ==
Mitchell was born to working class parents in Glen Huntly, a suburb of Melbourne, Australia, in March 1952. The family moved to Ashwood, a new Housing Commission suburb soon after. He attended Ashwood Primary School (1957–1963) and Ashwood High School (1964–1969).

== Education ==
Mitchell holds the following degrees: PhD in Economics, University of Newcastle, 1998; Bachelor of Commerce, Deakin University, 1977; and Master of Economics Monash University, 1982. He completed a Master's Preliminary at the University of Melbourne in 1978 (with first-class honours).

== Career ==
=== Academic ===
The University of Newcastle lists Mitchell as an emeritus professor. He is also Docent Professor of Global Political Economy at the University of Helsinki and guest international professor at Kyoto University.

=== Activist ===
Mitchell works to promote active government economic policies and the use of fiscal deficits as a tool to enhance well-being and environmental sustainability. He is Director of the Centre of Full Employment and Equity (CofFEE), a non-profit, research organisation at the University of Newcastle. Its mission statement is to advance research and policies that can restore full employment and achieve a society that "delivers equitable outcomes for all".

Mitchell participates in public and community activities on the issues of politics, economics, fiscal sustainability, and the environment.

Mitchell opposes neo-liberal economic theories and practices; he disputes the "revisionism" of History ostensibly perpetrated by mainstream or conservative economists, especially in relation to the policies of the New Deal. He has often been called to appear as an expert witness in industrial matters in state and federal tribunals in Australia, as well as in various government enquiries. His work in childcare industrial cases in Victoria and New South Wales influenced the realignments in the relevant State and Federal Awards in that sector.

=== Author ===
Mitchell coined the term Modern Monetary Theory, also known as MMT. He coined the term in reference to John Maynard Keynes' claim that for at least 4,000 years money has been "a creature of the state". He is a prominent promoter of MMT in macroeconomics.

He has written extensively in the fields of macroeconomics, econometrics and public policy. He has published widely in refereed academic journals and books and regularly gives conference presentations abroad.

==== Modern Monetary Theory: Bill and Warren's Excellent Adventure ====
This book was published by Lola Press in July 2024 and is co-written with Warren Mosler. The book offers a combination of biography, provenance, history and economic analysis where the co-founders of MMT clarify what constitutes MMT and how their ideas were developed.

==== Macroeconomics ====
His book Macroeconomics (Macmillan, March 2019), co-written with L. Randall Wray and Martin Watts, is a textbook that "encourages students to take a more critical approach to the prevalent assumptions around the subject of macroeconomics, by comparing and contrasting heterodox and orthodox approaches to theory and policy ... based on the principles of Modern Monetary Theory (MMT)".

==== Reclaiming the State: A Progressive Vision of Sovereignty for a Post-Neoliberal World ====
His 2017 book Reclaiming the State: A Progressive Vision of Sovereignty for a Post-Neoliberal World (September, 2017), co-written with Italian journalist Thomas Fazi, "reconceptualises the nation state as a vehicle for progressive change. They show how despite the ravages of neoliberalism, the state still contains resources for democratic control of a nation's economy and finances. The populist turn provides an opening to develop an ambitious but feasible left political strategy. It offers an urgent, provocative and prescient political analysis of our current predicament, and lays out a comprehensive strategy for revitalising progressive economics in the 21st century."

==== Eurozone Dystopia: Groupthink and Denial on a Grand Scale ====
His book Eurozone Dystopia: Groupthink and Denial on a Grand Scale (May 2015), provides a critical history and analysis from the perspective of Modern Monetary Theory of the euro area crisis.

==== Full Employment Abandoned ====
Full Employment Abandoned: Shifting Sands and Policy Failures (2008), co-written with Joan Muysken of Maastricht University, traces the theoretical analysis of the nature and causes of unemployment over the last 150 years and argue that the shift from involuntary to so-called "natural rate" concepts of unemployment are behind an "ideological backlash" against state intervention as notably advocated, within the frame of the free economy, by Keynes in the 1930s. The authors further contend that unemployment is a reflection of systemic policy failures, rather than an "individual problem". They present a theoretical and empirical critique of the neo-liberal approach and suggest that the reinstatement of full employment, along with price stability, is a viable policy goal, achievable through an activist fiscal policy.

The notion of job guarantee is introduced, whereby the government would guarantee a job to every willing and able adult individual, paying a wage that would become society's minimum wage, and would be expression of the aspiration of the society of the lowest acceptable standard of living.

== Living Legend ==
In November 2023, he was listed as one of 44 academics in Australia across all disciplines that were considered to be 'Living Legends' by a Special Research report published in The Australian. The report stated these academics were deemed to be "living legends ... because they attract worldwide attention by virtue of their ideas". The analysis termed Mitchell an "eminent scholar" and he was the only economist listed.

== Musician ==
Mitchell has played guitar professionally in bands over the years. Mitchell currently plays with Pressure Drop, a Melbourne-based reggae-dub band, originally popular in the 1970s and early 1980s. The band reformed in 2010.

Mitchell often refers to the economics discipline, and especially the academia, in disparaging terms, stating, only half-jokingly, that his work as a musician does less damage to people. "I think my economics profession is very dangerous," he says.

== Personal life ==
Mitchell is a "passionate" cyclist. He was an "active bike racer" when, in 1995, he founded the website Cyclingnews.com, which was sold in 1999 to the Australian media company Knapp Communications. It was subsequently bought in 2007 by Future plc.

== See also ==
- Fiat money vs. commodity money
- Government accounting
- Balanced budget
- Legal Tender Cases
- NAIBER

== Additional sources ==
- Mitchell, William, Joan Muysken, Tom Van Veen: Growth and cohesion in the European Union: The Impact of Macroeconomic Policy (2006), Edward Elgar Publishing, ISBN 978-1-84542-611-8
- Mitchell, William & Joan Muysken: Full Employment Abandoned: Shifting Sands and Policy Failures (2008), Edward Elgar Publishing 320 pp, Hardback, ISBN 978-1-85898-507-7
