= Buffer stock scheme =

Attempt to use commodity storage for the purpose of stabilizing prices

A buffer stock scheme (commonly implemented as intervention storage, the "ever-normal granary") is a price stabilization scheme in which surplus commodities are bought and stored for later sale during shortages, usually for an individual commodity market or an entire economy.

== Real-world examples ==
The United States Strategic Petroleum Reserve stores 727 million barrels of crude petroleum, which is sold or lent during shortages.

=== Two-price scheme ===
Graphical example of a two-price buffer stock scheme

Most buffer stock schemes work along the same rough lines: first, two prices are determined, a floor and a ceiling (minimum and maximum price). When the price drops close to the floor price (after a new rich vein of silver is found, for example), the scheme operator (usually government) will start buying up the stock, ensuring that the price does not fall further. Likewise, when the price rises close to the ceiling, the operator depresses the price by selling off its holdings. In the meantime, it must either store the commodity or otherwise keep it out of the market (for example, by destroying it).

If a basket of commodities is stored, their price stabilization can in turn stabilize the overall price level, preventing inflation. This scenario is illustrated on the right. Taking the market for wheat as an example, here, in years with normal harvests (S1) the price is within the allowed range and the operator does not need to act.

In bumper years (S3), however, the prices begins to fall, and the government must buy wheat to prevent the price from collapsing; likewise, in years with bad harvests (S2), the government must sell its stock to keep prices down. The result is far less fluctuation in price. Price stability then leads to greater joint welfare (the sum of consumer and producer surplus.)

=== Single-price scheme ===
A single-price buffer stock scheme, such as an ever-normal granary

As illustrated, the term "buffer stock scheme" can also refer to a scheme where the floor price and ceiling price are equal; in other words, an intervention in the market to ensure a fixed price. For such stores to be effective, the figure for "average supply" must be adjusted periodically to keep up with any broad trends toward increased yield. That is, it must truly be an average of probable yield outcomes at that given point in time.

The diagram shows the supply and demand for a grain market. S3 and S2 show the supply of grain in high- and low-yield years, respectively, and S1 shows the average supply. The government buys grain during high-yield years and sells grain during low-yield years. The price is thus stabilized to P3, rather than fluctuating between P1 and P2, as it did before.

== Side effects ==
The primary action of buffer stocks, creating price stability, is often combined with other mechanisms to meet other goals such as the promotion of domestic industry. That is achieved by setting a minimum price for a certain product above the equilibrium price, the point at which the supply and demand curves cross, which guarantees a minimum price to producers, encouraging them to produce more, thus creating a surplus ready to be used as a buffer stock. The price stability itself may also tempt firms into the market, further boosting supply.

The upside is security of supply (such as food security); the downside is huge stockpiles, or in other cases, destruction of commodities. The scheme also makes domestic food more expensive for other countries to purchase and operation of such a scheme can be costly to the operator.

Their main advantage, when compared to other forms of government intervention in markets, is that they are a mechanism that achieves its objectives "quickly and directly".

== History ==
Many agricultural schemes have been implemented over the years, although many have collapsed. Rubber and timber schemes have also been created to guarantee prices for the producers.

=== Ever-normal granaries ===
Building on simpler predecessors and concepts, the first actual ever-normal granary was built in 54 BC. Its name was "Chang-ping can", and its translation provides the English name. It was promoted by Wang Anshi during the Northern Song period and thereafter. Another example of ever-normal granaries is during the Sui dynasty in China (seventh century AD). The system was used in the Han, Jin, Sui and Tang dynasties. When the system collapsed during the An Lushan Rebellion, massive famine and cannibalism broke out. Although not the first to implement this concept, nowhere else in the world was such a system practiced at such a large scale and long span of time. In the Qing dynasty (1644–1911) the government established a nation-wide state granary system, which involved a total of 2.2–3.3 million tonnes of grain, the largest such system in the world. Over 100 million lives were saved by the grain distribution scheme. In the 1850s Taiping Rebellion the granary system was destroyed and never fully restored.

Storage of agricultural products for price stabilization has been used in modern times in many countries, including the United States. The term "ever-normal granary" was adopted from a Columbia University dissertation on Confucian economic practice that was read by future US Secretary of Agriculture Henry A. Wallace circa 1926, before he came into office. Wallace brought the term into the mainstream of American agropolitical thinking after the 1934 drought. One example of this idea was presented by Benjamin Graham in his book, Storage and Stability, written in 1937 during the Great Depression. Graham suggested that much like years of high agricultural yields, the years of overproduction of commodities in general could be neutralized by storing commodities until periods of underproduction. The idea was in response to overproduction of goods during the depression, as well as the desire to preserve jobs and to stabilize prices.

=== EU intervention storage ===
The creation of the EU's Common Agricultural Policy was the trigger for the creation of modern Europe's large-scale intervention storage. In an attempt to stabilize markets, and set prices across the EU member states, the Common Agricultural Policy allowed the states to place huge reserves of produce into intervention storage in an attempt to flatten the natural supply and demand curves.

During the 1980s, especially in Britain, the farming community received large monetary incentives to reduce production of certain crops. The establishment of milk quotas was one mechanism employed to enforce production limits on farmers. A particularly good run of summers during the period 1985–86 saw a large surfeit of produce coming onto the market and the first intervention stores.

One such store run by "High Post Grain Silos" leased 18 unused aircraft hangars at the former Bitteswell airfield and filled them with over 250,000 tonnes of feed wheat. The storage solution was simple, the grain was shipped into the hangars directly from the farm, having first passed a testing criterion. The stored grain was cooled by forcing air through the grain stack, a process which temporarily preserved the grain.

Some intervention storage is still being conducted in the EU, although not to the scale of the 1980s.

== Labor buffer stock ==
Some economists, particularly of the Modern Monetary Theory school, favor creating a buffer stock of unskilled labor in the form of a government-funded job guarantee. Any individual who was ready, willing, and able to work would be employed at a set nominal wage. By employing and stabilizing the price of unskilled labor, a job guarantee is claimed to impart price stability to the economy as a whole, bring the unemployment rate to zero permanently, and create an effective minimum wage.
