= Hysteresis (economics) =

Economic effects which persist after their cause has ended

In economics, hysteresis (from Ancient Greek ύστερέω (hystereō) 'lag behind, come later than') consists of effects that persist after the initial causes giving rise to the effects are removed. Two of the main economics areas where hysteresis effects are invoked for explaining phenomena are unemployment and international trade. It has also been applied in micro-economics to studies of demand responses to changes in price, notably in transport economics where the first published application was on the choice between travelling by two methods of transport, by Goodwin (1977), because habit can be an important influence on daily behaviour.

For example, in labor economics, hysteresis refers to the possibility that periods of high unemployment tend to increase the rate of unemployment below which inflation begins to accelerate; this is commonly referred to as the natural rate of unemployment or non-accelerating inflation rate of unemployment (NAIRU).

== Implication for statistical characterization of unemployment ==
If the unemployment rate exhibits hysteresis, then it follows a statistically non-stationary process, because the expected value of the unemployment rate now and in the future permanently shifts when the rate itself changes. The process with hysteresis is a unit root process, which in its simplest form can be characterized as

$$U_t = U_{t-1} + e_t,$$

where $U_t$ is the unemployment rate at time t and $e_t$ is a stationary error term representing outside shocks to the rate. According to this characterization, $E_{t-1}(U_{t+\tau}) = U_{t-1}$ for all $\tau = 0, 1, \ldots$, where $E_{t-1}$ refers to an expectation conditional on values observed no later than time t–1; any temporary shock to unemployment, represented by a single non-zero value of $e_t$, results in a permanent change to expected unemployment (even for $\tau$ indefinitely large so the expectation is for indefinitely far into the future). A more elaborate model would allow $E_{t-1}(U_{t+\tau})$ to go up positively but less than one-for-one with $e_t$. In contrast, a non-hysteresis model of unemployment would have $U_t$ following a stationary process, so that $E_{t-1}(U_{t+\tau})$ for arbitrarily large $\tau$ would always equal a permanently fixed natural rate of unemployment.

== Causes ==
When some negative shock reduces employment in a company or industry, there are fewer employed workers left. As the employed workers usually have the power to influence or set wages, their reduced number incentivizes them to bargain for even higher wages when the economy again gets better, instead of letting the wage stay at the equilibrium wage level, where the supply and demand of workers would match. This causes hysteresis, i.e., the unemployment becomes permanently higher after negative shocks.

It has also been argued that unemployed people lose their skills during unemployment, which makes them less likely to again get jobs.

== Policy implications ==
If there is no hysteresis in unemployment, then for example if the central bank wishes to lower the inflation rate it may shift to a contractionary monetary policy, which if not fully anticipated and believed will temporarily increase the unemployment rate; if the contractionary policy persists, the unemployment rise will eventually disappear as the unemployment rate returns to the natural rate. Then the cost of the anti-inflation policy will have been temporary unemployment. But if there is hysteresis, the unemployment rise initiated by the contractionary policy will never completely go away, and in this case the cost of the anti-inflation policy will have been permanently higher unemployment, making the policy less likely to have greater benefits than costs.

== Evidence ==
The European Central Bank has found strong empirical support for hysteresis in labour markets. Using OECD data for 29 countries from 2002 to 2019, the ECB found that shocks to unemployment permanently raise the non-accelerating inflation rate of unemployment (NAIRU), implying that demand-driven fluctuations can have enduring effects on labour market equilibrium. A study by the Federal Reserve Board using US data from 1983 to 2019 similarly identify permanent demand shocks that durably lower output, employment and investment, so far as to explaining more than half of long-run output fluctuations.

The experience of the United Kingdom since the early 1980s counts against hysteresis as a determinant of the natural rate of unemployment, as unemployment fell much faster in the recovery from the early 1990s recession than after the early 1980s recession. An econometric study of fourteen OECD countries rejected the hysteresis hypothesis, as did a study at the state level in the US.

== See also ==
- Insider–outsider theory of employment
