= White Paper on Full Employment in Australia =

1945 document

The white paper Full Employment in Australia, published in 1945, was the defining document of the official economic policy in Australia until the 1970s. For the first time, the Australian government accepted an obligation to guarantee full employment and to intervene as necessary to implement that guarantee. The preparation of the paper was ordered by The Australian Labor Party Prime Minister John Curtin and his Employment Minister John Dedman and undertaken by a group of economists headed by H. C. Coombs.

The white paper also declared the importance of the welfare state.

In Australia, a significant contribution to living standards has been made in the past, and will continue to be made, by a high level of social services. Some of these are in the form of direct money payments, such as invalid and old-age pensions, child endowment and widows' pensions. Others are services provided directly by governments and public authorities, including education, health and medical services, kindergartens and libraries. (p. 12)

== Background ==
The contrasting experiences of the Great Depression and the Second World War convinced the Labor Party that governments could and must intervene to ensure the achievement of full employment. The introduction to the white paper summed this up:

Despite the need for more houses, food, equipment and every other type of product, before the war not all those available for work were able to find employment or to feel a sense of security in their future. On the average during the twenty years between 1919 and 1939 more than one-tenth of the men and women desiring work were unemployed. In the worst period of the depression well over 25 per cent were left in unproductive idleness. By contrast, during the war no financial or other obstacles have been allowed to prevent the need for extra production being satisfied to the limit of our resources.

=== Keynesian economics ===
The basic ideas behind the white paper were those set out by John Maynard Keynes in his 1936 work The General Theory of Employment, Interest and Money. In it, Keynes' argued that the economy could remain at high levels of unemployment for indefinite periods in the absence of government action.

Keynes made an argument for the causes of periodic unemployment and for a policy response, stating that recessions and depressions occurred because the economy was destabilised by fluctuations in private demand, and particularly in levels of investment. The remedy he advocated was that governments should increase their own demand in periods of depression, particularly through public works. The increase in income generated by public works would then obstensibly be fed into demand for other goods and services, yielding a stimulus to the private sector.

== Diminishment ==
Following a period of persistently high inflation and low growth in the 1970s, the neoclassical synthesis that had arisen from Keynes' work and that had ultimately provided the theoretical basis of the policies implicated by the white paper lost credibility among academics and policymakers due to its failure to explain and provide solutions to the crisis. Full employment having been proven impossible to palatably maintain under the conditions the country had just faced, and succeeding work in macroeconomics having identified a Non-Accelerating Inflation Rate of Unemployment, a non-zero rate of unemployment became acceptable in policymaking.

== Criticism ==
Torleiv Hytten was an early critic of the white paper. In 1949, he stated that it had "nothing very substantial to offer in the way of concrete policy" and that full employment was incompatible with economic stability and would not survive adverse economic conditions.

== See also ==
- Basic wage
- Harvester case
