= Joan Muysken =

Dutch economist (b. 1948)

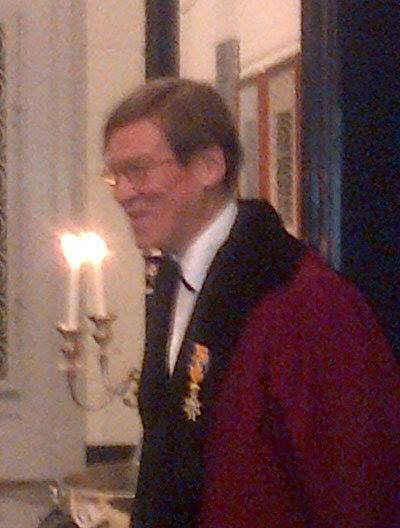
- Born: 18 December 1948 (age 77); Delft, Netherlands

Academic work
- Discipline: Political economy
- School or tradition: Post-Keynesian economics
- Institutions: Maastricht University
- Website: Information at IDEAS / RePEc

Joan Muysken (born 18 December 1948, in Delft) is a Dutch professor emeritus of Economics at the Maastricht University.

== Higher education ==
Muysken received his PhD in economics from the University of Groningen on the aggregation of production functions.

== Academic career ==
Muysken is currently professor of economics at the Faculty of Economics and Business Administration, Maastricht University, Netherlands, where he teaches macroeconomics and labour economics.

Muysken has been a visiting researcher at the University of Oslo in 1980. In 1983, he was assistant professor at the SUNY in Buffalo, New York. He was a visiting professor at the Catholic University of Louvain in Belgium, in 1989; at the University of Newcastle, Australia in 1995 and again in 2000; at the Centre for European Economic Research in Mannheim, Germany, in 2000; and at the Social Science Research Center Berlin in Germany, in May 2000.

== Researcher and author ==
Muysken's research includes work on endogenous growth and diffusion of technologies; skill mismatch; job competition; analysis of unemployment; portfolio investment and other topics, including his work on health as a determinant of economic growth.

He has authored a number of articles, papers and books.

His most notable work, so far, is Full Employment Abandoned (2008), co-written with Australian economist Bill Mitchell. The authors trace the theoretical analysis of the nature and causes of unemployment over the last 150 years and argue that the shift from involuntary to so-called "natural rate" concepts of unemployment are behind an "ideological backlash" against state intervention as notably advocated, within the frame of the free economy, by Keynes in the 1930s. The authors further contend that unemployment is a reflection of systemic policy failures, rather than an "individual problem". They present a theoretical and empirical critique of the neo-liberal approach and suggest that the reinstatement of full employment, along with price stability, is a viable policy goal, achievable through an activist fiscal policy.

== Personal life ==
Muysken is married to Anne Marie du Saar. They have three children: Joan, Fransje, and Coen Muysken.

== See also ==
- Unemployment
- Job Guarantee
