= Centre of Full Employment and Equity =

- Legal status: Non-profit, research centre
- Purpose: To promote research aimed at restoring full employment and achieving an economy that delivers equitable outcomes for all.
- Location: Callaghan Campus, University of Newcastle, Australia
- Director: Bill Mitchell
- Affiliations: CofFEE-Europe
- Website: Centre of Full Employment and Equity

The Centre of Full Employment and Equity or CofFEE is an official research centre of the University of Newcastle, New South Wales, Australia, and has operated since 1998. CofFEE's membership is drawn from the disciplines of economics, politics, sociology and geography.

CofFEE states that it seeks to undertake and promote research into the goals of full employment, price stability and achieving an economy that delivers equitable outcomes for all. Its main focus is on macroeconomics, labour economics, regional development and monetary economics.

== Goals ==
The stated main aims of the Centre are to "promote research aimed at restoring full employment", and achieving "an economy that delivers equitable outcomes for all", and also determining how effective regional labour markets can be in creating employment for the disadvantaged.

== Research programs ==
Research programs of public interest include: work on the job guarantee policy and public sector employment, in general, in OECD countries; the development of alternative labour-market indicators (hours-based measures of labour underutilisation); creating effective employment arrangements for youth with psychosis; creating effective local labour-markets; advancing spatial research by reconstructing Australia’s economic geography; and a multi-level modelling approach for understanding "socio-economic opportunity and vulnerability."

=== South Africa ===
CofFEE researchers are currently working with the International Labour Organization on a project evaluating the public works employment program in South Africa and assessing the feasibility of establishing a coherent minimum wage system in South Africa.

== Coalition of Economic Policy Institutions ==
CofFEE is part of the Coalition of Economic Policy Institutions, which is a non-partisan forum "dedicated to promoting research and public discussion of issues related to macroeconomic and monetary policy."

== See also ==
- Job guarantee
- Modern Monetary Theory
