= Involuntary unemployment =

Condition in which a person is unemployed despite being willing to work

Involuntary unemployment occurs when a person is unemployed despite being willing to work at the prevailing wage. It is distinguished from voluntary unemployment, where a person chooses not to work because their reservation wage is higher than the prevailing wage. In an economy with involuntary unemployment, there is a surplus of labor at the current real wage. This occurs when some force prevents the real wage rate from decreasing to the real wage rate that would equilibrate supply and demand (such as a minimum wage above the market-clearing wage). Structural unemployment is also involuntary.

Economists have several theories explaining the possibility of involuntary unemployment, including implicit contract theory, disequilibrium theory, staggered wage setting, and efficiency wages.

The officially measured unemployment rate is the ratio of involuntary unemployment to the sum of involuntary unemployment and employment (the denominator of this ratio being the total labor force).

== Explanations ==
In the Shapiro-Stiglitz model, workers are paid at a level where they do not shirk. This prevents wages from dropping to market-clearing levels. Full employment cannot be achieved because workers would slack off if they were not threatened with the possibility of unemployment. The curve for the no-shirking condition (labeled NSC) goes to infinity at full employment.

Models based on implicit contract theory, like that of Costas Azariadis, are based on the hypothesis that labor contracts make it difficult for employers to cut wages. Employers often resort to layoffs rather than implement wage reductions. Azariadis argued that, given risk-averse workers and risk-neutral employers, contracts with the possibility of layoffs would be optimal.

In Keynesian theory, involuntary unemployment is associated with insufficient aggregate demand and is therefore closely related to demand-deficient unemployment.

Efficiency wage models suggest that employers pay their workers above market-clearing wages to enhance their productivity. In efficiency wage models based on shirking, employers are worried that workers may shirk, knowing that they can move to another job if they are caught. Employers make shirking costly by paying workers more than they would elsewhere, thereby incentivising them to avoid shirking. When all firms behave this way, an equilibrium is reached where unemployed workers are willing to work at prevailing wages.

Chart representing Malinvaud's typology includes a region with Keynesian unemployment, where there is an excess supply of goods and labor, and a region of classical unemployment, where there is an excess supply of labor and excess demand for goods.

Following earlier disequilibrium research, including that of Robert Barro and Herschel Grossman, work by Edmond Malinvaud made a distinction between classical unemployment, where real wages are too high for markets to clear, and Keynesian unemployment, involuntary unemployment due to inadequate aggregate demand. In Malinvaud's model, classical unemployment is remedied by cutting the real wage, while Keynesian unemployment requires an exogenous stimulus in demand. Unlike implicit contrary theory and efficiency wages, this line of research does not rely on a higher than market-clearing wage level. This type of involuntary unemployment aligns with Keynes' definition, whereas efficiency wages and implicit contract theory do not align well with Keynes' focus on demand deficiency.

== Perspectives ==
For many economists, involuntary unemployment is a real-world phenomenon of central importance to economics. Many economic theories have been motivated by the desire to understand and control involuntary unemployment.

Shapiro and Stiglitz, developers of an influential shirking model, stated: "To us, involuntary unemployment is a real and important phenomenon with grave social consequences that needs to be explained and understood."

Mancur Olson argued that real-world events like the Great Depression could not be understood without the concept of involuntary unemployment. He argued against economists who denied involuntary unemployment and put their theories ahead of "common sense and the observations and experiences of literally hundreds of millions of people... that there is also involuntary unemployment and that it is by no means an isolated or rare phenomenon".

Other economists do not believe that true involuntary unemployment exists or question its relevance to economic theory. Robert Lucas claims "...there is an involuntary element in all unemployment in the sense that no one chooses bad luck over good; there is also a voluntary element in all unemployment, in the sense that, however miserable one's current work options, one can always choose to accept them" and "the unemployed worker at any time can always find some job at once". Lucas dismissed the need for theorists to explain involuntary unemployment since it is "not a fact or a phenomenon which it is the task of theorists to explain. It is, on the contrary, a theoretical construct which Keynes introduced in the hope it would be helpful in discovering a correct explanation for a genuine phenomenon: large-scale fluctuations in measured, total unemployment." Along those lines, real business cycle and other models from Lucas's new classical school explain fluctuations in employment by shifts in labor supply driven by changes in workers' productivity and preferences for leisure.

Involuntary unemployment is also conceptually problematic with search-and-matching theories of unemployment. In these models, unemployment is voluntary in the sense that a worker might choose to endure unemployment during a long search for a higher-paying job than those immediately available; however, there is an involuntary element in the sense that a worker does not have control of the economic circumstances that force them to look for new work in the first place.

== See also ==
- Ghost job
- Identity (social science)
- Full employment
- Social rejection
- Unemployment
- Job guarantee
- Social stigma
- Social stress

== Sources ==
- Andolfatto, David (2008), "Search models of unemployment.", in Durlauf, Steven N.; Blume, Lawrence E. (eds.), The New Palgrave: A Dictionary of Economics (Second ed.), Palgrave Macmillan, pp. 349–355, CiteSeerX 10.1.1.552.4934, doi:10.1057/9780230226203.1497, ISBN 978-0-333-78676-5
- Azariadis, C. (1975). "Implicit contracts and underemployment equilibria". Journal of Political Economy. 83 (6): 1183–202. doi:10.1086/260388. S2CID 154745887.
- De Vroey, Michel (2002). "Involuntary unemployment in Keynesian economics". In Snowdon, Brian; Vane, Howard (eds.). An Encyclopedia of Macroeconomics. Northampton, Massachusetts: Edward Elgar Publishing. pp. 381–385. ISBN 978-1-84542-180-9.
- Lucas, Robert E. (May 1978), "Unemployment policy", American Economic Review, 68 (2): 353–357, JSTOR 1816720
- Mayer, Thomas (1997), "What Remains of the Monetarist Counter-Revolution?", in Snowdon, Brian; Vane, Howard R. (eds.), Reflections on the Development of Modern Macroeconomics, Cheltenham, UK: Edward Elgar Publishing, pp. 55–102, ISBN 978-1-85898-342-4
- McCombie, John S. (1987). "Keynes and the Nature of Involuntary Unemployment". Journal of Post Keynesian Economics. 10 (2): 202–215. doi:10.1080/01603477.1987.11489673. JSTOR 4538065.
- Olson, Mancur (1982). The rise and decline of nations : economic growth, stagflation, and social rigidities. New Haven: Yale University Press. ISBN 978-0300030792.
- Shapiro, C.; Stiglitz, J. E. (1984). "Equilibrium Unemployment as a Worker Discipline Device". The American Economic Review. 74 (3): 433–444. JSTOR 1804018.
- Shapiro, Carl; Stiglitz, Josephy E. (December 1985), "Can Unemployment Be Involuntary? Reply", The American Economic Review, 75 (5): 1215–1217, JSTOR 1818667
- Taylor, John B. (2008), "Involuntary Unemployment.", in Durlauf, Steven N.; Blume, Lawrence E. (eds.), The New Palgrave: A Dictionary of Economics (Second ed.), Palgrave Macmillan, pp. 566–570, doi:10.1057/9780230226203.0850, ISBN 978-0-333-78676-5
- Tsoulfidis, Lefteris (2010). Competing schools of economic thought. London: Springer. ISBN 978-3-540-92692-4.
