= Money printing =

Money printing may refer to:

- Money creation to increase the money supply
- Debt monetization, financing the government by borrowing from the central bank, in effect creating new money
- Security printing as applied to banknotes ("paper money")
- Quantitative easing, a type of monetary policy meant to lower interest rates
- Modern Monetary Theory, an economic theory that advocates creating new money to fund government purchases
