= Joshua Weiner =

American poet (born 1963)

- Born: 1963 (age 62–63); Boston, Massachusetts, U.S.
- Education: Northwestern University; University of California, Berkeley
- Occupation: Professor
- Spouse: Sarah Blake
- Writing career
- Genre: Poetry

Joshua Weiner (born 1963 Boston) is an American poet, essayist, and translator. Weiner is a professor of English and creative writing as well as a graduate instructor at the University of Maryland, College Park.

== Life ==
He graduated from Northwestern University, and earned his PhD in English and American Literature at the University of California, Berkeley. He served as the writing coordinator at the Fine Arts Work Center in Provincetown, and as a visiting assistant professor at Northwestern University.

He lives in Washington, D.C., with his wife, the novelist Sarah Blake, and two sons, and teaches literature and poetry workshops at University of Maryland, College Park, where he is Professor of English. He is also the poetry editor of Tikkun magazine.

His work has appeared in Best American Poetry, the Nation, the American Scholar, New York Review of Books, Chicago Tribune, Threepenny Review, TriQuarterly, Chicago Review, Boston Review, B O D Y, Yale Review, Slate, The New Republic, and other journals.

In 2021, Weiner published Flight & Metamorphosis, an English and German translation of the Jewish poet, Holocaust survivor, and Nobel laureate Nelly Sachs. The book was published through Farrar, Straus & Giroux as a comparative translation in English next to the original German. The book was created with Linda B. Parshall. In a review by David Woo for The Poetry Foundation, Weiner was praised for his aptitude for translating elements of abstraction and Jewish mysticism.

"Weiner’s masterful introduction argues for the expansion of Sachs’s reputation beyond “O the chimneys!” to the multivalent “deep dark” of this book’s Geheimnis (“mystery,” “secret,” and “home” all at once). The timeless lyricism of Flight and Metamorphosis may be what we need as war, atrocity, and exile return to Europe," said Woo.

== Awards ==
- 2000 Witter Bynner Fellowship
- 2002 Whiting Award
- 2003 Rome Prize in Literature from the American Academy and Institute of Arts and Letters
- 2012-2013 Amy Lowell Poetry Travelling Scholarship
- 2014 Guggenheim Memorial Foundation Fellowship

== Works ==
- "Found Letter", Poetry Foundation
- "Shame", Poetry, January 2006
- "The Dog State", Boston Review
- "WEEGEE: CONEY ISLAND BEACH AFTER MIDNIGHT; TRAMPOLINE; EPITAPH; ART PEPPER; POSTCARD TO THOM". Beltway Poetry Quarterly. 8 (3). Summer 2007.
- "The Bed". Threepenny Review. Fall 2004.
- The World's Room. University of Chicago Press. 2001. ISBN 978-0-226-88576-6.
- From the Book of Giants. University of Chicago Press. 15 April 2010. pp. 5–. ISBN 978-0-226-89051-7.
- The Figure of a Man Being Swallowed by a Fish. University of Chicago Press. 2013. ISBN 978-0-226-01701-3. "Joshua Weiner."
- Flight & Metamorphosis. Farrar, Straus & Giroux. 2021. ISBN 9780374606435.

=== Essays ===
- "Canon Fodder: A highly personal list", Poetry Foundation
- History, memory, and poetics in Thomas McGrath's Letter to an imaginary friend. University of California, Berkeley. 1988.
- Mina Loy among the moderns. University of California, Berkeley. 1998.

=== Editor ===
- Joshua Weiner, ed. (2009). At the Barriers: On the Poetry of Thom Gunn. University of Chicago Press. ISBN 978-0-226-89043-2.
