= Currency war =

Competition between nations to gain competitive advantage by manipulating monetary supply

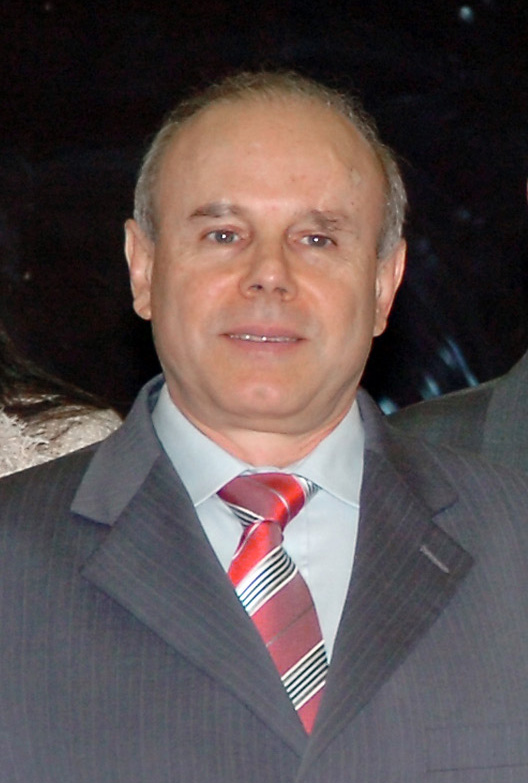
Brazilian Finance Minister Guido Mantega, who made headlines when he raised the alarm about a currency war in September 2010

Currency war, also known as competitive devaluations, is a condition in international affairs where countries seek to gain a trade advantage over other countries by causing the exchange rate of their currency to fall in relation to other currencies. As the exchange rate of a country's currency falls, exports to other countries become more competitive, and imports into the country become more expensive. Both effects benefit the domestic industry, and thus employment, which receives a boost in demand from both domestic and foreign markets. However, the price increases for import goods (as well as in the cost of foreign travel) are unpopular as they harm citizens' purchasing power; and when all countries adopt a similar strategy, it can lead to a general decline in international trade, harming all countries.

Historically, competitive devaluations have been rare as countries have generally preferred to maintain a high value for their currency. Countries have generally allowed market forces to work, or have participated in systems of managed exchanges rates. An exception occurred when a currency war broke out in the 1930s when countries abandoned the gold standard during the Great Depression and used currency devaluations in an attempt to stimulate their economies. Since this effectively pushes unemployment overseas, trading partners quickly retaliated with their own devaluations. The period is considered to have been an adverse situation for all concerned, as unpredictable changes in exchange rates reduced overall international trade.

According to Guido Mantega, former Brazilian Minister for Finance, a global currency war broke out in 2010. This view was echoed by numerous other government officials and financial journalists from around the world. Other senior policy makers and journalists suggested the phrase "currency war" overstated the extent of hostility. With a few exceptions, such as Mantega, even commentators who agreed there had been a currency war in 2010 generally concluded that it had fizzled out by mid-2011.

States engaging in possible competitive devaluation since 2010 have used a mix of policy tools, including direct government intervention, the imposition of capital controls, and, indirectly, quantitative easing. While many countries experienced undesirable upward pressure on their exchange rates and took part in the ongoing arguments, the most notable dimension of the 2010–11 episode was the rhetorical conflict between the United States and China over the valuation of the yuan. In January 2013, measures announced by Japan which were expected to devalue its currency sparked concern of a possible second 21st century currency war breaking out, this time with the principal source of tension being not China versus the US, but Japan versus the Eurozone. By late February, concerns of a new outbreak of currency war had been mostly allayed, after the G7 and G20 issued statements committing to avoid competitive devaluation. After the European Central Bank launched a fresh programme of quantitative easing in January 2015, there was once again an intensification of discussion about currency war.

== Background ==
In the absence of intervention in the foreign exchange market by national government authorities, the exchange rate of a country's currency is determined, in general, by market forces of supply and demand at a point in time. Government authorities may intervene in the market from time to time to achieve specific policy objectives, such as maintaining its balance of trade or to give its exporters a competitive advantage in international trade.

=== Reasons for intentional devaluation ===
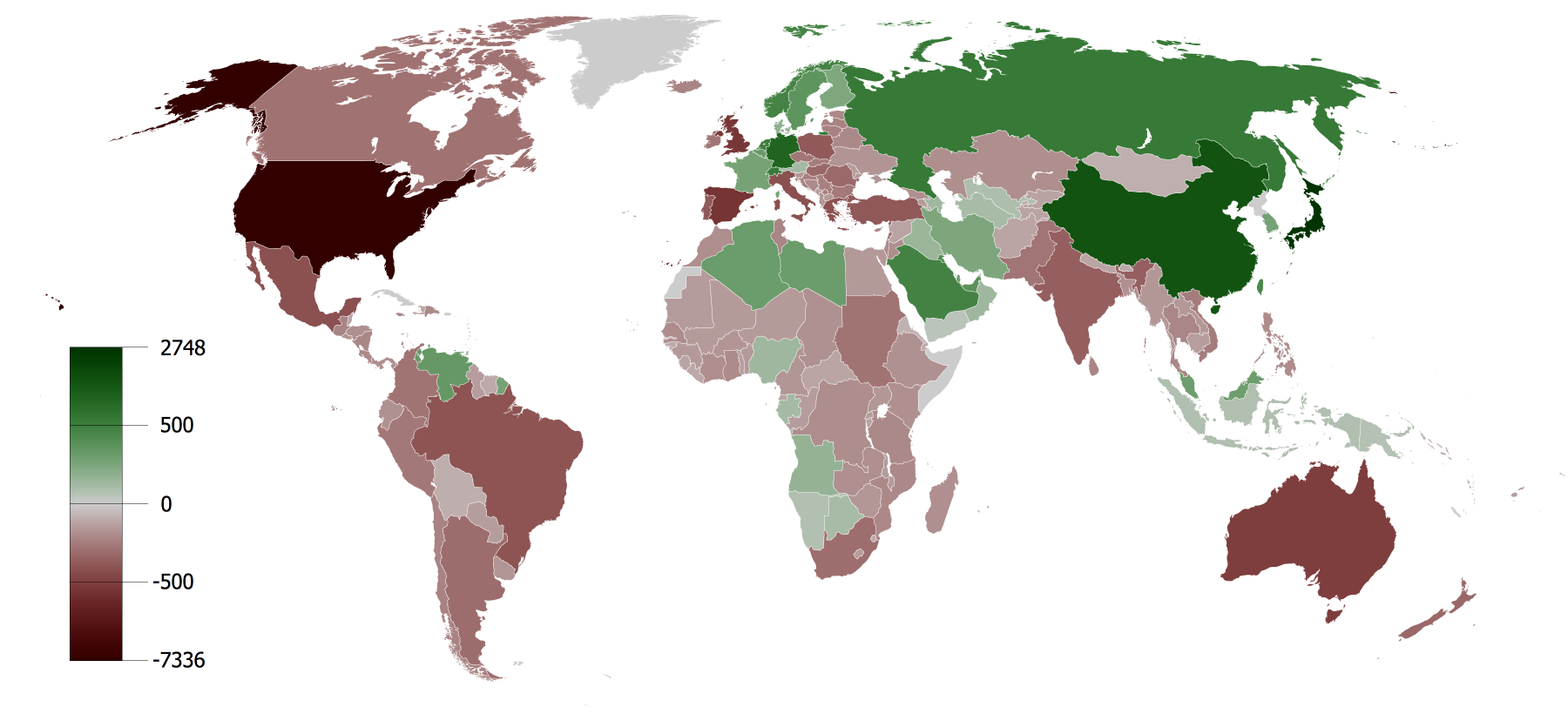
Cumulative current account balance 1980–2008 (US$ Billions) based on International Monetary Fund data

Devaluation, with its adverse consequences, has historically rarely been a preferred strategy. According to economist Richard N. Cooper, writing in 1971, a substantial devaluation is one of the most "traumatic" policies a government can adopt – it almost always resulted in cries of outrage and calls for the government to be replaced. Devaluation can lead to a reduction in citizens' standard of living as their purchasing power is reduced both when they buy imports and when they travel abroad. It also can add to inflationary pressure. Devaluation can make interest payments on international debt more expensive if those debts are denominated in a foreign currency, and it can discourage foreign investors. At least until the 21st century, a strong currency was commonly seen as a mark of prestige, while devaluation was associated with weak governments.

However, when a country is suffering from high unemployment or wishes to pursue a policy of export-led growth, a lower exchange rate can be seen as advantageous. From the early 1980s the International Monetary Fund (IMF) has proposed devaluation as a potential solution for developing nations that are consistently spending more on imports than they earn on exports. A lower value for the home currency will raise the price for imports while making exports cheaper. This tends to encourage more domestic production, which raises employment and gross domestic product (GDP). Such a positive impact is not guaranteed however, due for example to effects from the Marshall–Lerner condition. Devaluation can be seen as an attractive solution to unemployment when other options, like increased public spending, are ruled out due to high public debt, or when a country has a balance of payments deficit which a devaluation would help correct. A reason for preferring devaluation common among emerging economies is that maintaining a relatively low exchange rate helps them build up foreign exchange reserves, which can protect against future financial crises.

=== Mechanism for devaluation ===
A state wishing to devalue, or at least check the appreciation of its currency, must work within the constraints of the prevailing International monetary system. During the 1930s, countries had relatively more direct control over their exchange rates through the actions of their central banks. Following the collapse of the Bretton Woods system in the early 1970s, markets substantially increased in influence, with market forces largely setting the exchange rates for an increasing number of countries. However, a state's central bank can still intervene in the markets to effect a devaluation – if it sells its own currency to buy other currencies (Note: In practice this chiefly means purchasing assets such as government bonds that are denominated in other currencies.) then this will cause the value of its own currency to fall – a practice common with states that have a managed exchange rate regime. Less directly, quantitative easing (common in 2009 and 2010), tends to lead to a fall in the value of the currency even if the central bank does not directly buy any foreign assets.

A third method is for authorities simply to talk down the value of their currency by hinting at future action to discourage speculators from betting on a future rise, though sometimes this has little discernible effect. Finally, a central bank can effect a devaluation by lowering its base rate of interest; however this sometimes has limited effect, and, since the end of World War II, most central banks have set their base rate according to the needs of their domestic economy.

If a country's authorities wish to devalue or prevent appreciation against market forces exerting upwards pressure on the currency, and retain control of interest rates, as is usually the case, they will need capital controls in place—due to conditions that arise from the impossible trinity trilemma.

=== Quantitative easing ===
Quantitative easing (QE) is the practice in which a central bank tries to mitigate a potential or actual recession by increasing the money supply for its domestic economy. This can be done by printing money and injecting it into the domestic economy via open market operations. There may be a promise to destroy any newly created money once the economy improves in order to avoid inflation.

Quantitative easing was widely used as a response to the 2008 financial crisis, especially by the United States and the United Kingdom, and, to a lesser extent, the Eurozone. The Bank of Japan was the first central bank to claim to have used such a policy. (Note: To practice quantitative easing on a wide scale it helps to have a reserve currency, as do the United States, Japan, UK, and Eurozone, otherwise there is a risk of market speculators triggering runaway devaluation to a far greater extent than would be helpful to the country.) (Note: Theoretically, money could be shared out among the entire population, though, in practice, the new money is often used to buy assets from financial institutions. The idea is that the extra money will help banks restore their balance sheets, and will then flow from there to other areas of the economy where it is needed, boosting spending and investment. As of November 2010 however, credit availability has remained tight in countries that have undertaken QE, suggesting that money is not flowing freely from the banks to the rest of the economy.)

Although the U.S. administration has denied that devaluing their currency was part of their objectives for implementing quantitative easing, the practice can act to devalue a country's currency in two indirect ways. Firstly, it can encourage speculators to bet that the currency will decline in value. Secondly, the large increase in the domestic money supply will lower domestic interest rates, often they will become much lower than interest rates in countries not practising quantitative easing. This creates the conditions for a carry trade, where market participants can engage in a form of arbitrage, borrowing in the currency of the country practising quantitative easing, and lending in a country with a relatively high rate of interest. Because they are effectively selling the currency being used for quantitative easing on the international markets, this can increase the supply of the currency and hence push down its value. By October 2010 expectations in the markets were high that the United States, UK, and Japan would soon embark on a second round of QE, with the prospects for the Eurozone to join them less certain.

In early November 2010 the United States launched QE2, the second round of quantitative easing, which had been expected. The Federal Reserve made an additional $600 billion available for the purchase of financial assets. This prompted widespread criticism from China, Germany, and Brazil that the United States was using QE2 to try to devalue its currency without consideration to the effect the resulting capital inflows might have on emerging economies.

Some leading figures from the critical countries, such as Zhou Xiaochuan, governor of the People's Bank of China, have said the QE2 is understandable given the challenges facing the United States. Wang Jun, the Chinese Vice Finance Minister suggested QE2 could "help the revival of the global economy tremendously". President Barack Obama has defended QE2, saying it would help the U.S. economy to grow, which would be "good for the world as a whole". Japan also launched a second round of quantitative easing though to a lesser extent than the United States; Britain and the Eurozone did not launch an additional QE in 2010.

=== International conditions required for currency war ===
For a widespread currency war to occur a large proportion of significant economies must wish to devalue their currencies at once. This has so far only happened during a global economic downturn.

An individual currency devaluation has to involve a corresponding rise in value for at least one other currency. The corresponding rise will generally be spread across all other currencies (Note: Though not necessarily evenly: in the mid 20th and early 21st century countries would often devalue specifically against the dollar, so while the devaluing currency would lower its exchange rate against all currencies, a corresponding rise against the global average might be confined largely just to the dollar and any currencies currently governed by a dollar peg. A further complication is that the dollar is often affected by such huge daily flows on the foreign exchange that the rise caused by a small devaluation may be offset by other transactions.) and so unless the devaluing country has a huge economy and is substantially devaluing, the offsetting rise for any individual currency will tend to be small or even negligible. In normal times other countries are often content to accept a small rise in the value of their own currency or at worst be indifferent to it. However, if much of the world is suffering from a recession, from low growth or are pursuing strategies which depend on a favourable balance of payments, then nations can begin competing with each other to devalue against a commonly and internationally accepted consideration. In such conditions, once a small number of countries begin intervening this can trigger corresponding interventions from others as they strive to prevent further deterioration in their export competitiveness.

== Historical overview ==
=== Up to 1930 ===
For millennia, going back to at least the Classical period, governments have often devalued their currency by reducing its intrinsic value. Methods have included reducing the percentage of gold in coins, or substituting less precious metals for gold. However, until the 19th century, (Note: Despite global trade growing substantially in the 17th and 18th centuries.) the proportion of the world's trade that occurred between nations was very low, so exchanges rates were not generally a matter of great concern. Rather than being seen as a means to help exporters, the debasement of currency was motivated by a desire to increase the domestic money supply and the ruling authorities' wealth through seigniorage, especially when they needed to finance wars or pay debts. A notable example is the substantial devaluations which occurred during the Napoleonic Wars. When nations wished to compete economically they typically practiced mercantilism – this still involved attempts to boost exports while limiting imports, but rarely by means of devaluation. (Note: Devaluation could however be used as a last resort by mercantilist nations seeking to correct an adverse trade balance – see for example chapter 23 of Keynes' General Theory.) A favoured method was to protect home industries using current account controls such as tariffs. From the late 18th century, and especially in Britain, which, for much of the 19th century, was the world's largest economy, mercantilism became increasingly discredited by the rival theory of free trade, which held that the best way to encourage prosperity would be to allow trade to occur free of government imposed controls. The intrinsic value of money became formalised with a gold standard being widely adopted from about 1870–1914, so while the global economy was now becoming sufficiently integrated for competitive devaluation to occur there was little opportunity. Following the end of World War I, many countries other than the US experienced recession and few immediately returned to the gold standard, so several of the conditions for a currency war were in place. However, currency war did not occur as the UK was trying to raise the value of its currency back to its pre-war levels, effectively cooperating with the countries that wished to devalue against the market. (Note: This was against the interests of British workers and industrialists who preferred devaluation, but was in the interests of the financial sector, with government also influenced by a moral argument that they had the duty to restore the value of the pound as many other countries had used it as a reserve currency and trusted GB to maintain its value.) By the mid-1920s many former members of the gold standard had rejoined, and while the standard did not work as successfully as it had pre war, there was no widespread competitive devaluation.

=== Currency war in the Great Depression ===
During the Great Depression of the 1930s, most countries abandoned the gold standard. With widespread high unemployment, devaluations became common, a policy that has frequently been described as "beggar thy neighbour", in which countries purportedly compete to export unemployment. However, because the effects of a devaluation would soon be offset by a corresponding devaluation and in many cases retaliatory tariffs or other barriers by trading partners, few nations would gain an enduring advantage.

The exact starting date of the 1930s currency war is open to debate. The three principal parties were Britain, France, and the United States. For most of the 1920s the three generally had coinciding interests; both the US and France supported Britain's efforts to raise Sterling's value against market forces. Collaboration was aided by strong personal friendships among the nations' central bankers, especially between Britain's Montagu Norman and America's Benjamin Strong until the latter's early death in 1928. Soon after the Wall Street crash of 1929, France lost faith in Sterling as a source of value and begun selling it heavily on the markets. From Britain's perspective both France and the US were no longer playing by the rules of the gold standard. Instead of allowing gold inflows to increase their money supplies (which would have expanded those economies but reduced their trade surpluses) France and the US began sterilising the inflows, building up hoards of gold. These factors contributed to the Sterling crises of 1931; in September of that year Britain substantially devalued and took the pound off the gold standard. For several years after this global trade was disrupted by competitive devaluation and by retaliatory tariffs. The currency war of the 1930s is generally considered to have ended with the Tripartite monetary agreement of 1936.

=== Bretton Woods era ===
From the end of World War II until about 1971, the Bretton Woods system of semi-fixed exchange rates meant that competitive devaluation was not an option, which was one of the design objectives of the systems' architects. Additionally, global growth was generally very high in this period, so there was little incentive for currency war even if it had been possible.

=== 1973 to 2000 ===
While some of the conditions to allow a currency war were in place at various points throughout this period, countries generally had contrasting priorities and at no point were there enough states simultaneously wanting to devalue for a currency war to break out. (Note: Though a few commentators have asserted the Nixon shock was in part an act of currency war, and also the pressure exerted by the United States in the months leading up to the Plaza accords.) On several occasions countries were desperately attempting not to cause a devaluation but to prevent one. So states were striving not against other countries but against market forces that were exerting undesirable downwards pressure on their currencies. Examples include the United Kingdom during Black Wednesday and various tiger economies during the 1997 Asian financial crisis. During the mid-1980s the United States did desire to devalue significantly, but were able to secure the cooperation of other major economies with the Plaza Accord. As free market influences approached their zenith during the 1990s, advanced economies and increasingly transition and even emerging economies moved to the view that it was best to leave the running of their economies to the markets and not to intervene even to correct a substantial current account deficit. (Note: Though developing economies were encouraged to pursue export led growth – see Washington Consensus.)

=== 2000 to 2008 ===
During the 1997 Asian financial crisis several Asian economies ran critically low on foreign reserves, leaving them forced to accept harsh terms from the IMF, and often to accept low prices for the forced sale of their assets. This shattered faith in free market thinking among emerging economies, and from about 2000 they generally began intervening to keep the value of their currencies low. (Note: Some had been devaluing from as early as the 1980s, but it was only after 1999 that it became common, with the developing world as a whole running a CA surplus instead of a deficit from 1999.) This enhanced their ability to pursue export led growth strategies while at the same time building up foreign reserves so they would be better protected against further crises. No currency war resulted because on the whole advanced economies accepted this strategy—in the short term it had some benefits for their citizens, who could buy cheap imports and thus enjoy a higher material standard of living. The current account deficit of the US grew substantially, but until about 2007, the consensus view among free market economists and policy makers like Alan Greenspan, then Chairman of the Federal Reserve, and Paul O'Neill, US Treasury secretary, was that the deficit was not a major reason for worry.

This is not say there was no popular concern; by 2005 for example a chorus of US executives along with trade union and mid-ranking government officials had been speaking out about what they perceived to be unfair trade practices by China.

Economists such as Michael P. Dooley, Peter M. Garber, and David Folkerts-Landau described the new economic relationship between emerging economies and the US as Bretton Woods II.

=== Competitive devaluation after 2009 ===
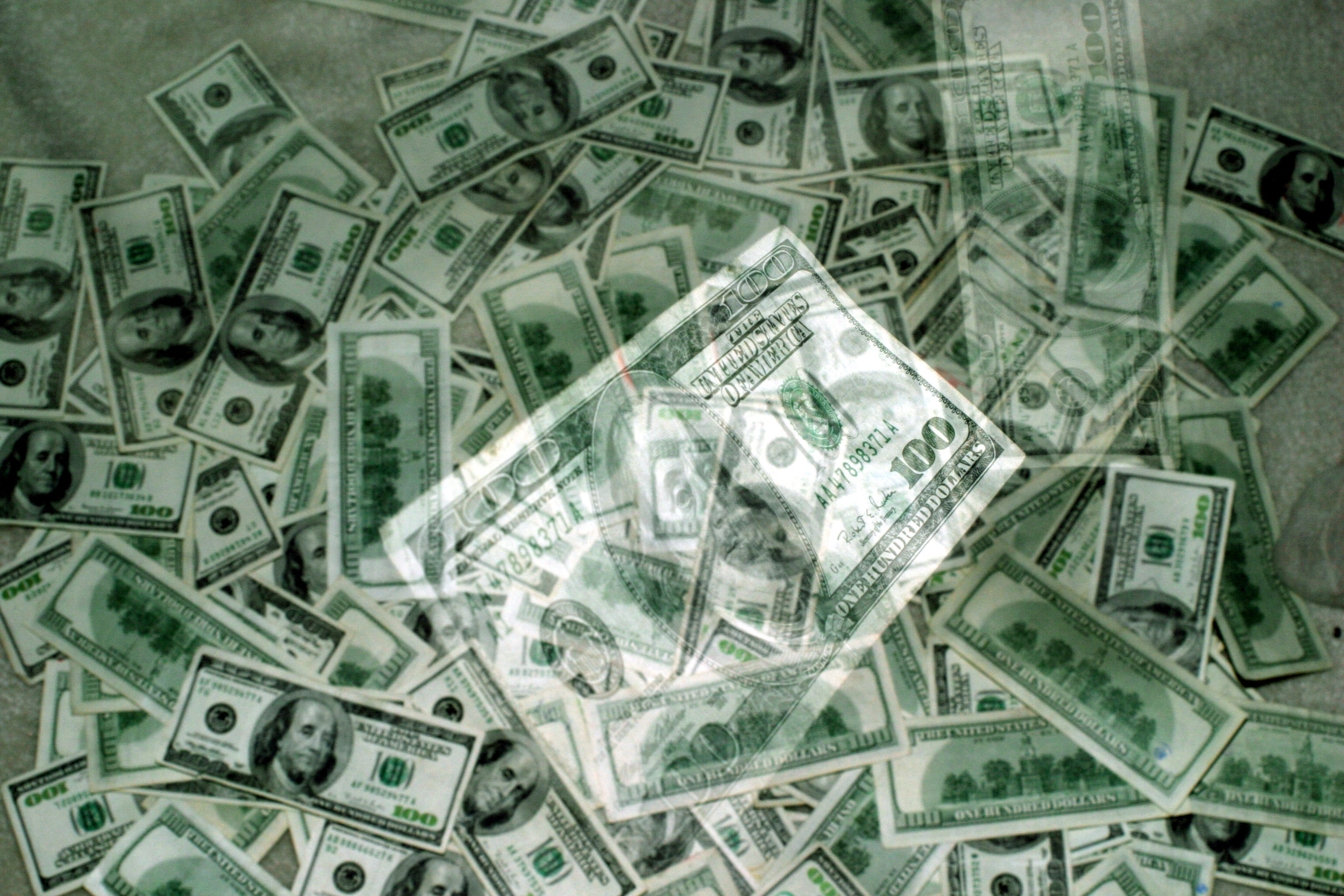
As the world's leading Reserve currency, the US dollar was central to the 2010–2011 outbreak of currency war.

By 2009 some of the conditions required for a currency war had returned, with a severe economic downturn seeing global trade in that year decline by about 12%. There was a widespread concern among advanced economies about the size of their deficits; they increasingly joined emerging economies in viewing export led growth as their ideal strategy. In March 2009, even before international co-operation reached its peak with the 2009 G-20 London Summit, economist Ted Truman became one of the first to warn of the dangers of competitive devaluation. He also coined the phrase competitive non-appreciation.

On 27 September 2010, Brazilian Finance Minister Guido Mantega announced that the world is "in the midst of an international currency war." Numerous financial journalists agreed with Mantega's view, such as the Financial Times' Alan Beattie and The Telegraph's Ambrose Evans-Pritchard. Journalists linked Mantega's announcement to recent interventions by various countries seeking to devalue their exchange rate including China, Japan, Colombia, Israel and Switzerland.

Other analysts such as Goldman Sach's Jim O'Neill asserted that fears of a currency war were exaggerated. In September, senior policy makers such as Dominique Strauss-Kahn, then managing director of the IMF, and Tim Geithner, US Secretary of the Treasury, were reported as saying the chances of a genuine currency war breaking out were low; however by early October, Strauss-Kahn was warning that the risk of a currency war was real. He also suggested the IMF could help resolve the trade imbalances which could be the underlying casus belli for conflicts over currency valuations. Mr Strauss-Kahn said that using currencies as weapons "is not a solution [and] it can even lead to a very bad situation. There's no domestic solution to a global problem."

Considerable attention had been focused on the US, due to its quantitative easing programmes, and on China. For much of 2009 and 2010, China was under pressure from the US to allow the yuan to appreciate. Between June and October 2010, China allowed a 2% appreciation, but there were concerns from Western observers that China only relaxed its intervention when under heavy pressure. The fixed peg was not abandoned until just before the June G20 meeting, after which the yuan appreciated by about 1%, only to devalue slowly again, until further US pressure in September when it again appreciated relatively steeply, just prior to the September US Congressional hearings to discuss measures to force a revaluation.

Reuters suggested that both China and the United States were "winning" the currency war, holding down their currencies while pushing up the value of the Euro, the Yen, and the currencies of many emerging economies.

Martin Wolf, an economics leader writer with the Financial Times, suggested there may be advantages in western economies taking a more confrontational approach against China, which in recent years had been by far the biggest practitioner of competitive devaluation. Although he advised that rather than using protectionist measures which may spark a trade war, a better tactic would be to use targeted capital controls against China to prevent them buying foreign assets in order to further devalue the yuan, as previously suggested by Daniel Gros, Director of the Centre for European Policy Studies.

A contrasting view was published on 19 October, with a paper from Chinese economist Huang Yiping arguing that the US did not win the last "currency war" with Japan, (Note: Huang classes the conflicting opinions over the relative valuations of the US dollar and Japanese yen in the 1980s as a currency war, though the label was not widely used for that period.) and has even less of a chance against China; but should focus instead on broader "structural adjustments" at the November 2010 G-20 Seoul summit.

Discussion over currency war and imbalances dominated the 2010 G-20 Seoul summit, but little progress was made in resolving the issue.

In the first half of 2011 analysts and the financial press widely reported that the currency war had ended or at least entered a lull, though speaking in July 2011 Guido Mantega told the Financial Times that the conflict was still ongoing.

As investor confidence in the global economic outlook fell in early August, Bloomberg suggested the currency war had entered a new phase. This followed renewed talk of a possible third round of quantitative easing by the US and interventions over the first three days of August by Switzerland and Japan to push down the value of their currencies.

In September, as part of her opening speech for the 66th United Nations Debate, and also in an article for the Financial Times, Brazilian president Dilma Rousseff called for the currency war to be ended by increased use of floating currencies and greater cooperation and solidarity among major economies, with exchange rate policies set for the good of all rather than having individual nations striving to gain an advantage for themselves.

In March 2012, Rousseff said Brazil was still experiencing undesirable upwards pressure on its currency, with its Finance Minister Guido Mantega saying his country will no longer "play the fool" and allow others to get away with competitive devaluation, announcing new measures aimed at limiting further appreciation for the Real. By June however, the Real had fallen substantially from its peak against the Dollar, and Mantega had been able to begin relaxing his anti-appreciation measures.

=== Currency war in 2013 ===
In mid January 2013, Japan's central bank signalled the intention to launch an open ended bond buying programme which would likely devalue the yen. This resulted in short lived but intense period of alarm about the risk of a possible fresh round of currency war.

Numerous senior central bankers and finance ministers issued public warnings, the first being Alexei Ulyukayev, the first deputy chairman at Russia's central bank. He was later joined by many others including Park Jae-wan, the finance minister for South Korea, and by Jens Weidmann, president of the Bundesbank. Weidmann held the view that interventions during the 2009–11 period were not intense enough to count as competitive devaluation, but that a genuine currency war is now a real possibility. Japan's economy minister Akira Amari has said that the Bank of Japan's bond buying programme is intended to combat deflation, and not to weaken the yen.

In early February, ECB president Mario Draghi agreed that expansionary monetary policy like QE have not been undertaken to deliberately cause devaluation. Draghi's statement did however hint that the ECB may take action if the Euro continues to appreciate, and this saw the value of the European currency fall considerably. A mid February statement from the G7 affirmed the advanced economies commitment to avoid currency war. It was initially read by the markets as an endorsement of Japan's actions, though later clarification suggested the US would like Japan to tone down some of its language, specifically by not linking policies like QE to an expressed desire to devalue the Yen. Most commentators have asserted that if a new round of competitive devaluation occurs it would be harmful for the global economy. However some analysts have stated that Japan's planned actions could be in the long term interests of the rest of the world; just as he did for the 2010–11 incident, economist Barry Eichengreen has suggested that even if many other countries start intervening against their currencies it could boost growth worldwide, as the effects would be similar to semi-coordinated global monetary expansion. Other analysts have expressed skepticism about the risk of a war breaking out, with Marc Chandler, chief currency strategist at Brown Brothers Harriman, advising that: "A real currency war remains a remote possibility."

On 15 February, a statement issued from the G20 meeting of finance ministers and central bank governors in Moscow affirmed that Japan would not face high level international criticism for its planned monetary policy. In a remark endorsed by US Fed chairman Ben Bernanke, the IMF's managing director Christine Lagarde said that recent concerns about a possible currency war had been "overblown". Paul Krugman has echoed Eichengreen's view that central bank's unconventional monetary policy is best understood as a shared concern to boost growth, not as currency war. Goldman Sachs strategist Kamakshya Trivedi has suggested that rising stock markets imply that market players generally agree that central bank's actions are best understood as monetary easing and not as competitive devaluation. Other analysts have however continued to assert that ongoing tensions over currency valuation remain, with currency war and even trade war still a significant risk. Central bank officials ranging from New Zealand and Switzerland to China have made fresh statements about possible further interventions against their currencies.

Analyses has been published by currency strategists at RBS, scoring countries on their potential to undertake intervention, measuring their relative intention to weaken their currency and their capacity to do so. Ratings are based on the openness of a country's economy, export growth and real effective exchange rate (REER) valuation, as well as the scope a country has to weaken its currency without damaging its economy. As of January 2013, Indonesia, Thailand, Malaysia, Chile and Sweden are the most willing and able to intervene, while the UK and New Zealand are among the least.

From March 2013, concerns over further currency war diminished, though in November several journalists and analysts warned of a possible fresh outbreak. The likely principal source of tension appeared to shift once again, this time not being the U.S. versus China or the Eurozone versus Japan, but the U.S. versus Germany. In late October U.S. treasury officials had criticized Germany for running an excessively large current account surplus, thus acting as a drag on the global economy.

=== Currency war in 2015 ===
A €60bn per month quantitative easing programme was launched in January 2015 by the European Central Bank. While lowering the value of the Euro was not part of the programme's official objectives, there was much speculation that the new Q.E. represents an escalation of currency war, especially from analysts working in the FX markets. David Woo for example, a managing director at Bank of America Merrill Lynch, stated there was a "growing consensus" among market participants that states are indeed engaging in a stealthy currency war. A Financial Times editorial however claimed that rhetoric about currency war was once again misguided.

In August 2015, China devalued the yuan by just under 3%, partially due to a weakening export figures of −8.3% in the previous month. The drop in export is caused by the loss of competitiveness against other major export countries including Japan and Germany, where the currency had been drastically devalued during the previous quantitative easing operations. It sparked a new round of devaluation among Asian currencies, including the Vietnam dong and the Kazakhstan tenge.

== Comparison between 1932 and 21st-century currency wars ==
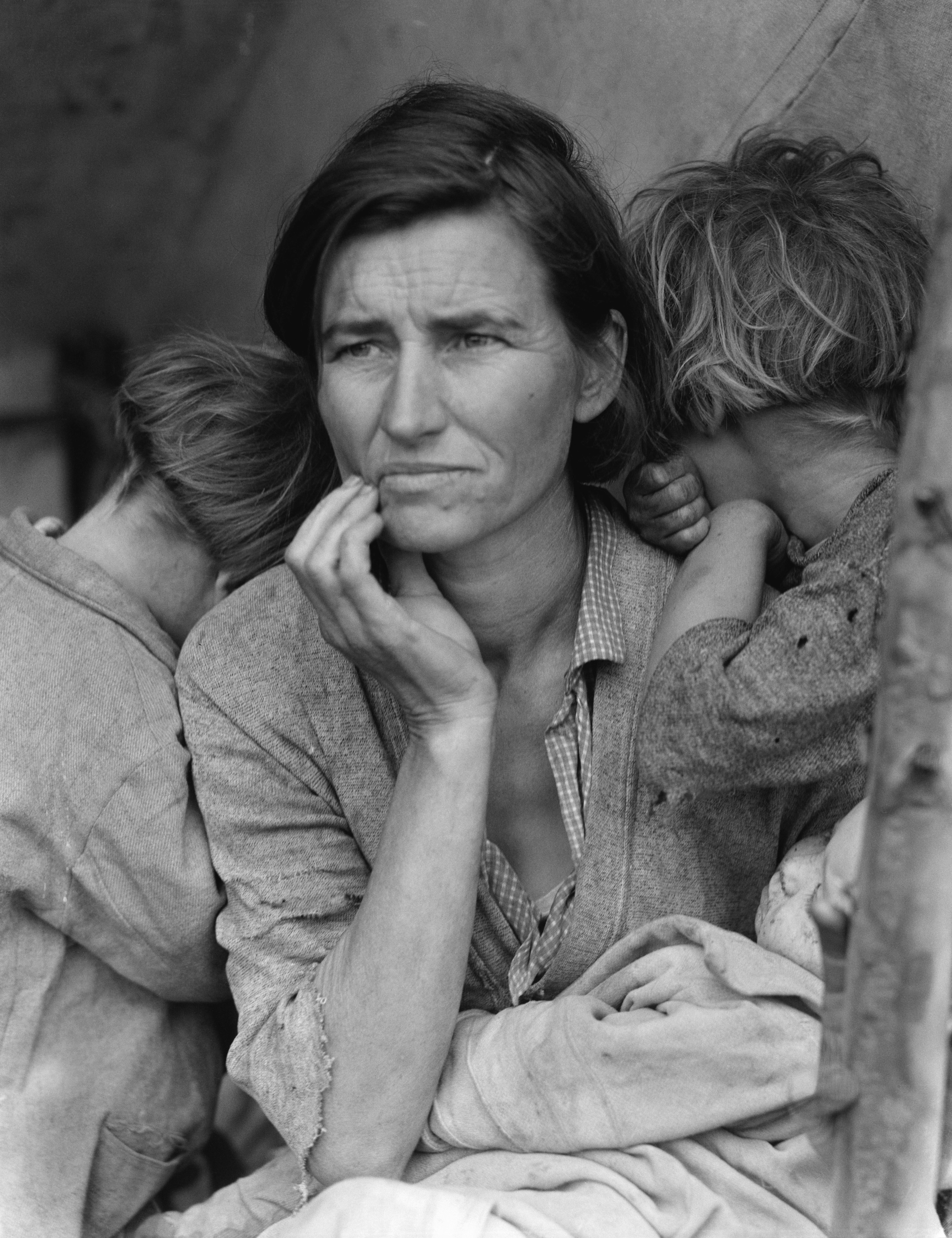
Migrant Mother by Dorothea Lange (1936). This portrait of a 32-year-old farm-worker with seven children became an iconic photograph symbolising defiance in the face of adversity. A currency war contributed to the worldwide economic hardship of the 1930s Great Depression.

Both the 1930s and the outbreak of competitive devaluation that began in 2009 occurred during global economic downturns. An important difference with the 2010s is that international traders are much better able to hedge their exposures to exchange rate volatility because of more sophisticated financial markets. A second difference is that the later period's devaluations were invariably caused by nations expanding their money supplies by creating money to buy foreign currency, in the case of direct interventions, or by creating money to inject into their domestic economies, with quantitative easing. If all nations try to devalue at once, the net effect on exchange rates could cancel out, leaving them largely unchanged, but the expansionary effect of the interventions would remain. There has been no collaborative intent, but some economists such as Berkeley's Barry Eichengreen and Goldman Sachs's Dominic Wilson have suggested the net effect will be similar to semi-coordinated monetary expansion, which will help the global economy. (Note: Not all economists agree that further expansionary policy would help even if it is co-ordinated, and some fear it would cause excess inflation.) James Zhan of the United Nations Conference on Trade and Development (UNCTAD), however, warned in October 2010 that the fluctuations in exchange rates were already causing corporations to scale back their international investments.

Comparing the situation in 2010 with the currency war of the 1930s, Ambrose Evans-Pritchard of The Daily Telegraph suggested a new currency war may be beneficial for countries suffering from trade deficits. He noted that in the 1930s, it was countries with a big surplus that were severely impacted once competitive devaluation began. He also suggested that overly-confrontational tactics may backfire on the US by damaging the status of the dollar as a global reserve currency.

Ben Bernanke, chairman of the US Federal Reserve, also drew a comparison with competitive devaluation in the interwar period, referring to the sterilisation of gold inflows by France and America, which helped them sustain large trade surpluses but also caused deflationary pressure on their trading partners, contributing to the Great Depression. Bernanke stated that the example of the 1930s implies that the "pursuit of export-led growth cannot ultimately succeed if the implications of that strategy for global growth and stability are not taken into account."

In February 2013, Gavyn Davies for The Financial Times emphasized that a key difference between the 1930s and the 21st-century outbreaks is that the former had some retaliations between countries being carried out not by devaluations but by increases in import tariffs, which tend to be much more disruptive to international trade.

== Other uses ==
The term "currency war" is sometimes used with meanings that are not related to competitive devaluation.

In the 2007 book, Currency Wars by Chinese economist Song Hongbing, the term is sometimes used in a somewhat contrary sense, to refer to an alleged practice where unscrupulous bankers lend to emerging market countries and then speculate against the emerging state's currency by trying to force it down in value against the wishes of that states' government. (Note: Neither the book nor its sequel Currency War 2 are available yet in English, but are best sellers in China and South East Asia.)

In another book of the same name, John Cooley uses the term to refer to the efforts of a state's monetary authorities to protect its currency from forgers, whether they are simple criminals or agents of foreign governments trying to devalue a currency and cause excess inflation against the home government's wishes.

Jim Rickards, in his 2011 book "Currency Wars: The Making of the Next Global Crisis," argues that the consequences of the Fed's attempts to prop up economic growth could be devastating for American national security. Although Rickard's book is largely concerned with currency war as competitive devaluation, it uses a broader definition of the term, classing policies that cause inflation as currency war. Such policies can be seen as metaphorical warfare against those who have monetary assets in favor of those who do not, but unless the effects of rising inflation on international trade are offset by a devaluation, inflationary policies tend to make a country's exports less competitive against foreign countries. In their review of the book, Publishers Weekly said: "Rickards's first book is an outgrowth of his contributions and a later two-day war game simulation held at the Applied Physics Laboratory's Warfare Analysis Laboratory. He argues that a financial attack against the U.S. could destroy confidence in the dollar. In Rickards's view, the Fed's policy of quantitative easing by lessening confidence in the dollar, may lead to chaos in global financial markets." Kirkus Reviews said: "In Rickards' view, the world is currently going through a third currency war ("CWIII") based on competitive devaluations. CWII occurred in the 1960s and '70s and culminated in Nixon's decision to take the dollar off the gold standard. CWI followed World War I and included the 1923 German hyperinflation and Roosevelt's devaluation of the dollar against gold in 1933. Rickards demonstrates that competitive devaluations are a race to the bottom, and thus instruments of a sort of warfare. CWIII, he writes, is characterized by the Federal Reserve's policy of quantitative easing, which he ascribes to what he calls "extensive theoretical work" on depreciation, negative interest rates and stimulation achieved at the expense of other countries. He offers a view of how the continued depreciation and devaluation of the dollar will ultimately lead to a collapse, which he asserts will come about through a widespread abandonment of a worthless inflated instrument. Rickards also provides possible scenarios for the future, including collaboration among a variety of currencies, emergence of a world central bank and a forceful U.S. return to a gold standard through an emergency powers–based legal regime. The author emphasizes that these questions are matters of policy and choice, which can be different."

Historically, the term has been used to refer to the competition between Japan and China for their currencies to be used as the preferred tender in parts of Asia in the years leading up to Second Sino-Japanese War.

== See also ==
- Trade war
- World-systems theory
