= QE4 =

QE4 may refer to:

- The fourth round of quantitative easing exhibited by the Federal Reserve since September 2019
- A mod for Quake III
