= Sterilization (economics) =

Economic action taken by a central bank

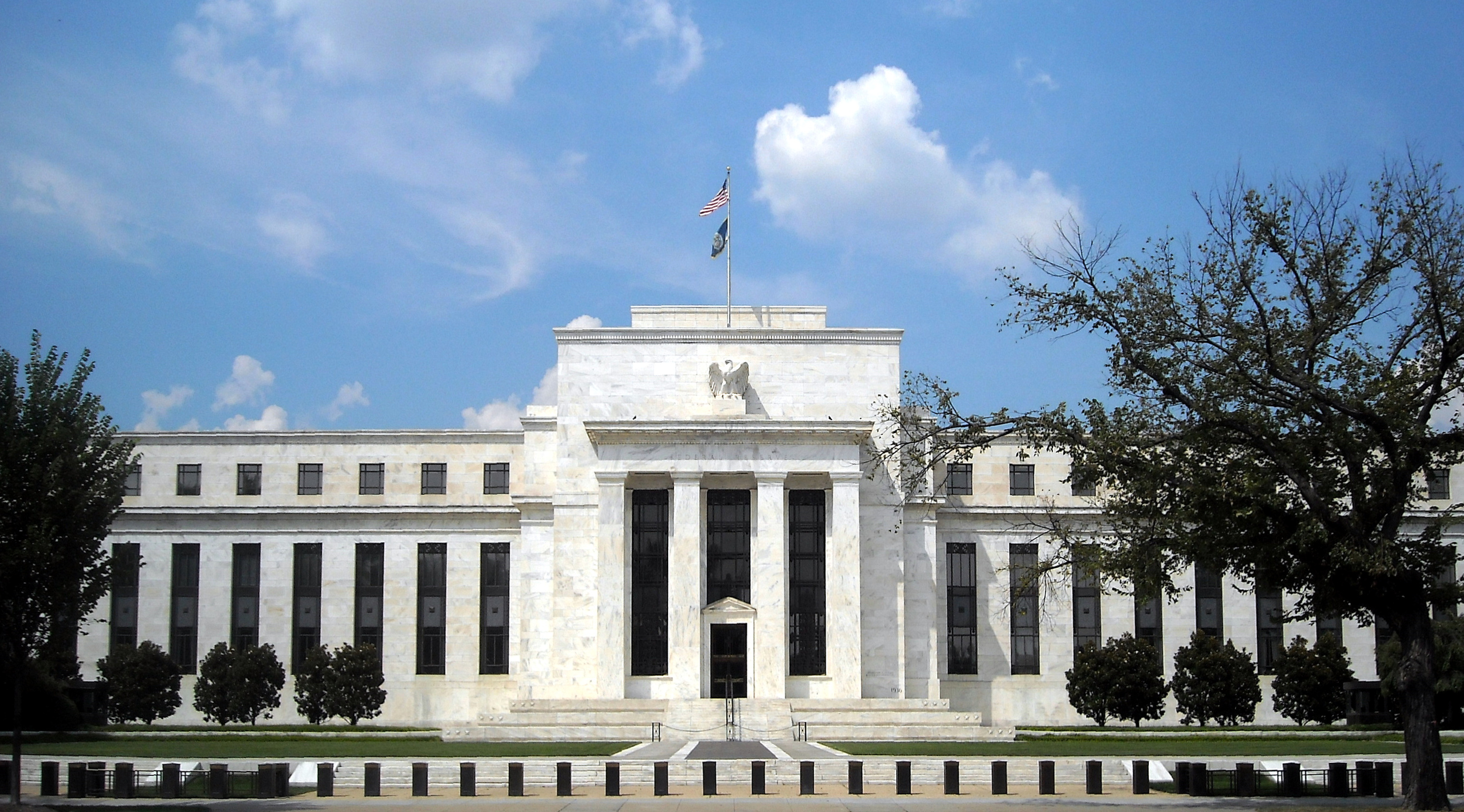
The Federal Reserve – The US Central Bank practiced sterilization in the troubled interwar period leading up to the Great Depression.

In macroeconomics, sterilization is action taken by a country's central bank to counter the effects on the money supply caused by a balance of payments surplus or deficit. This can involve open market operations undertaken by the central bank whose aim is to neutralize the impact of associated foreign exchange operations. The opposite is unsterilized intervention, where monetary authorities have not insulated their country's domestic money supply and internal balance against foreign exchange intervention.

Sterilization is most often used in the context of a central bank that takes actions to negate potentially harmful impacts of capital inflows – such as currency appreciation and inflation – both of which can reduce export competitiveness. More generally, it may refer to any form of monetary policy which seeks to hold the domestic money supply unchanged despite external shocks or other changes, including the flow of capital out of the relevant area (generally, a country).

In the second half of the 20th century, sterilization was sometimes associated with efforts by monetary authorities to "defend" the value of their currency. In the 1930s and in the 21st century, sterilization has most commonly been associated with efforts by nations with a balance of payments surplus to prevent currency appreciation.

== Examples ==
=== A sterilized intervention to prevent currency depreciation ===
Assume that a country's currency is depreciating. To prevent this, the country's central bank may decide to intervene in the foreign exchange market. To prop up the value of the nation's currency, the central bank may resort to creating artificial demand for its currency. It can do this by using some of its foreign exchange reserves to buy local currency. The resulting demand stops the currency's depreciation but also acts to reduce the domestic money supply in two ways. First the bank is directly removing some of the nation's currency from circulation as it buys it up. Secondly, if the central bank overshoots the target, the intervention can create or worsen a current account deficit due to the propped-up exchange rate being more favorable for importers than for exporters. This deficit sends currency out of the country, further decreasing liquidity.

The resulting lowering of the money supply likely will have a deflationary effect which can be undesirable, especially if the country already has substantial unemployment. To offset the effect on the money supply, the central bank may sterilize its foreign exchange intervention. It can do this by engaging in open market operations that supply liquidity into the system, by buying financial assets such as local-currency-denominated bonds, using local currency as payment.

A sterilized intervention against depreciation can only be effective in the medium term if the underlying cause behind the currency's loss of value can be addressed. If the cause was a speculative attack based on political uncertainty this can potentially be resolved. In practice, the cause driving sterilized interventions in the late 20th century was often that a high money supply had meant local interest rates were lower than they were internationally, creating the conditions for a carry trade. This involves market participants borrowing domestically and lending internationally at a higher rate of interest, a side effect of which is to exert downwards pressure on the currency being borrowed. Because a sterilizing intervention holds the money supply unchanged at its high level, the locally available interest rates can still be low. The carry trade therefore continues to be profitable and the central bank must intervene again if it still wants to prevent depreciation. This can only go on so long before the central bank runs out of foreign currency reserves with which to intervene.

=== A sterilized intervention to prevent currency appreciation ===
A central bank can intervene on the foreign exchange markets to prevent currency appreciation by selling its own currency for foreign currency-denominated assets, thereby building up its foreign reserves as a happy side effect. However, because the central bank is creating or at least releasing more of its currency into circulation, this will expand the money supply – money spent buying foreign assets initially goes to other countries, but then soon finds its way back into the domestic economy as payment for exports. The expansion of the money supply can cause inflation, which can erode a nation's export competitiveness just as much as currency appreciation would.

The classic way to sterilize the inflationary effect of the extra money flowing into the domestic base is for the central bank to use open market operations where it sells bonds domestically, thereby soaking up new cash that would otherwise circulate around the home economy. A variety of other measures are sometimes used. A central bank normally makes a small loss from its overall sterilization operations, as the interest it earns from buying foreign assets to prevent appreciation is usually less than what it has to pay out on the bonds it issues domestically to check inflation. Over the first few years of the 21st century, China was able to make a good yearly profit on its sterilization operations, estimated at close to $60 billion a year. By about 2008, however, the country began to make a loss, estimated at $40 billion by 2010. Other countries also found sterilization more costly after 2008, relating to expansionary monetary policies adopted by advanced economies affected by the 2008 financial crisis, most especially the United States. which meant relatively low interest rates were available for their foreign assets. The increased losses from classic open market operations since 2008 have seen China increasingly use an alternative method for preventing monetary expansion—the raising of the reserve requirement for its larger banks.

In contrast to interventions against currency depreciation, there is no inherent limit on interventions aimed at preventing appreciation. If a central bank runs out of domestic currency to buy foreign reserves, it can always print more. There can be political pressure from other nations if they feel a country is giving its exporters too much of an advantage, at the extreme this can escalate to currency war. There can also be political pressure domestically if commentators feel too big a loss is being made by the sterilisation operations.

=== Sterilization under a gold standard ===
With a gold standard such as the one that was widely in effect from about 1871–1914, exchange rates are fixed so generally there is no currency appreciation or depreciation (except within a very narrow band, relating to the cost to ship gold between countries). So if one country enjoys a trade surplus, this results in it enjoying a net inflow of gold from its deficit trading partners. The automatic balancing mechanism is then for the surplus nation's money supply to be expanded by the inflowing gold. This will tend to lead to inflation or at least to the nations citizens having more money to spend on imports, and hence the surplus will be corrected.

To prevent the expansion of the money supply, central banks can effectively build up hoards of gold by employing a variety of measures such as increasing the amount of gold that banks need to store in their vaults for each unit of paper currency in circulation. Sterilization was used by the US and France in the 1920s and 1930s, initially with some success as they built up huge hoards of gold, but by the early 1930s it had contributed to a collapse in international trade that was harmful for the global economy and especially for the surplus nations.
