= Carbon quantitative easing =

Proposed unconventional monetary policy in international climate policy

Carbon quantitative easing (CQE) is an unconventional monetary policy or monetary program that is featured in a proposed international climate policy, called a global carbon reward or simply, the carbon reward. The main goal of CQE is to guarantee the price floor of a carbon reward market so that this market can scale to decarbonise the world economy. The market instrument is also called a 'carbon reward' and is denoted XCR, which is a provisional code for possible inclusion in ISO 4217. The XCR is a financial asset (not a currency) and its main purpose is to finance greenhouse gas (GHG) mitigation at scale and without the financial constraints that limit the utility of carbon credits. The XCR is technically not a carbon credit and it cannot be used to offset carbon emissions.

CQE is designed to ensure that the exchange rate of the XCR does not fall below an internationally agreed price floor. XCR's price floor would function as the price signal for the mitigation of GHG emissions within the carbon reward market. The most recent and authoritative definition of CQE is found in a policy working paper published in 2025, as follows:

"Carbon quantitative easing (CQE) is defined here as an internationally coordinated monetary program for central banks that belong to a monetary-carbon alliance. Each central bank of the alliance is required to participate in the CQE program with the aim of guaranteeing the XCR price floor in international markets. CQE requires member banks to purchase XCR with new bank reserves and in volumes defined by a common CQE formula. CQE does not involve creating or issuing XCR, and central banks only play the role of guarantor for the XCR price floor. CQE would be designed to achieve fairness and minimise unwanted monetary effects, such as monetary inflation and exchange rate volatility. Unlike traditional QE, CQE is long term, strategic, and does not involve buying government bonds, green bonds, or other securities."

== History ==
CQE was first proposed in 2017 by Delton Chen, Joël van der Beek, and Jonathan Cloud in order to create a new socioeconomic roadmap for delivering the main goals of the 2015 Paris Agreement. CQE was reviewed in 2018 by Guglielmo Zappalá as part of an economics thesis, and it was first mentioned in the mainstream media in 2020 with two online articles appearing in Bloomberg's business news service. The carbon reward policy was refined and clarified in a 2025 policy working paper by Delton Chen. This working paper provides the most recent and authoritative definition of CQE and the carbon reward policy itself. It also presents an economic justification for the policy.

CQE has yet to be included in mainstream narratives on the economics of climate change even though it has the scope to address many critically important climate-related systemic risks, such as weak carbon pricing, lack of climate funding, inherent uncertainty associated with climate tipping points, and lack of societal cooperation.

== International monetary program ==
Carbon quantitative easing (CQE) is the name of an internationally coordinated monetary program that instructs central banks to purchase XCR in open markets with the aim of defending the XCR price floor while the supply of XCR increases with time. CQE will instruct each participating central bank to purchase a specific volumes of XCR. CQE will be formula driven, with the formula being designed to equitably distribute the financial cost and monetary inflation. A monetary committee would be established to approve the XCR price floor and telegraph it to foreign exchange markets with the aim of establishing trust in the XCR asset and attracting investment demand for the XCR. With CQE, it is proposed that market participants will view the XCR as an investible asset with limited downside financial risk.

The ideal implementation of CQE will involve every central bank in the world, however CQE can be implemented with just the central banks of the 20-40 largest economies, approximately, given that this group of central banks represents about 80-90% of the world economy by nominal GDP. Prior to applying CQE, the participating central banks need to be given a mandate that allows them to purchase XCR and influence carbon markets. Central banks that participate in CQE will create additional bank reserves (M0) to buy the XCR. The expansion of M0 will directly increase the M1 money supply by the same amount.

=== Carbon Exchange Authority (CEA) ===
The XCR instrument would be managed by a supranational authority, called a Carbon Exchange Authority (CEA). The CEA would be responsible for the reward contracts, mitigation assessments, and associated carbon accounting. The CEA would also design the XCR price floor and the CQE program, however the CQE program would be approved by a monetary board that represents the interests of central banks. Central banks that participate in CQE would not be required to undertake any scientific or technical assessments related to climate change mitigation, thereby allowing central banks to focus on their traditional mandates. The formulation of CQE would be designed to minimise the unwanted impacts on inflation and exchange rate volatility, ceteris paribus.

=== Carbon reward market ===
The XCR price floor would be forward looking, with price guarantees for about a decade into the future, and price guidance for 100 years and rolling forward. The price floor would establish an explicit global price for carbon dioxide removal (CDR) with the objective of deploying sufficient CDR to achieve a relatively safe carbon budget and addressing the goals of the 2015 Paris Agreement. The XCR would also be used to incentivise conventional GHG mitigation (emissions reductions and avoidance) however the volume of XCR issued for conventional mitigation would be adaptive to achieve strategically important outcomes. Thus, the total volume of XCR issued globally would, by design, not be proportional to the mitigated carbon mass. The actual mass of GHGs mitigated would be recorded in the carbon accounting database held by the CEA and this data would be transparent to the public.

=== Carbon reward instrument (XCR) ===
The XCR would be a carbon-linked sovereign-backed financial asset and that would be issued to market participants who can verifiably mitigate GHGs under contract with the CEA. The XCR will establish a positive price signal for effective GHG mitigation, and it will complement existing carbon taxes, cap-and-trade, mitigation subsidies, carbon credits, and non-market policies.

The XCR would function as a store of value but it would not function as a medium of exchange. The XCR is not a currency and it would not be used as legal tender. By design, the XCR is not a carbon credit or International Tradable Mitigation Outcome (ITMO) and it would not be used for carbon offsetting.

There are several reasons why the XCR is not a carbon credit. One reason is that the XCR does not transfer the ownership of carbon. Another reason is that XCR is not fungible in terms of the mass of mitigated GHGs. To appreciate this last point, consider that the XCR's unit of account will be fixed for CDR and flexible for conventional mitigation. In other words, the XCR will have a unit of account of 1 tCO_{2}e of carbon dioxide removal (CDR) that is durably stored for at least 100 years, and it will also have a unit of account of 1/R tCO_{2}e of conventional GHG mitigation that is durable for at least 100 years. R is a 'reward multiplier,' and it is included in XCR's unit of account to enable the customisation of reward payments for conventional mitigation. This ability to customise reward payments for conventional mitigation should give the CEA the flexibility it would need to offer financial incentives sufficient to decarbonise every sector of the economy within a relatively narrow timeframe.

In summary, the XCR would have three key functions: it would function as a financial incentive for GHG mitigation, a store of value for private investing, and tracking device for linking financial rewards to the carbon accounts of mitigation projects.

== Potential advantages ==
The historical failure of the global community to share the costs of climate mitigation is a global market failure and is sometimes described as a type of prisoner's dilemma. A potential advantage of CQE is that it could be used to resolve the market failure with financial rewards that do not create any direct cost for governments, firms, or citizens. This capacity to finance mitigation at the global scale—without imposing direct costs—could be instrumental in reducing political disputes and maximising cooperation. The carbon reward policy, with its application of CQE, offers a new channel for scalable climate finance. A preliminary estimate of the monetary inflation suggests that this inflation "...would be moderate if the policy is implemented as designed."

== Comparison with other monetary policies ==
=== Quantitative easing ===
Quantitative easing (QE) by central banks typically involves the purchase of government bonds, corporate bonds and other financial assets to increase the money supply—either directly or indirectly. CQE, on the other hand, will result in the creation of new base money (M0) and an equivalent increase in M1 when central banks purchase XCR from brokers. CQE is therefore more targeted than regular QE when the aim is to decarbonise the economy. Traditional QE has been found to support carbon-intensive industries.

=== Green quantitative easing ===
Green quantitative easing (green QE) involves the trading of green bonds or climate bonds by individual central banks. According to a study by the Foundation for European Progressive Studies, the application of green QE could help to mitigate climate change, but on its own could not substantially influence the Earth's global average surface temperature or prevent severe climate change. CQE is significantly different because it aims to coordinate and aggregate the efforts of central banks, thereby generating an outcome that is more strongly correlated to global reductions in GHG emissions and global CDR. Unlike green QE, CQE will not require central banks to undertake any technical assessments of climate mitigation, and this is because the CEA will take responsibility for the XCR supply and market integrity.

=== Modern Monetary Theory ===
Modern Monetary Theory (MMT) is a heterodox macroeconomic theory that is concerned with increasing the supply of national currencies for funding public goods and encouraging full employment. CQE is significantly different to the monetary policies that are proposed under MMT, and this is because CQE is designed to coordinate multiple central banks to achieve an international objective. MMT, on the other hand, aims to expand the money supply of an individual nation for domestic reasons. Furthermore, CQE and the XCR do not depend on borrowing, debt creation or interest charges. CQE is unlikely to pose a direct inflationary risk for any one country because CQE attempts to spread the resulting monetary inflation across the globe.
