= Sarah Blake (novelist) =

American writer

- Blake at Politics and Prose in 2026
- Education: Miss Porter's School
- Occupation: Writer
- Spouse: Joshua Weiner
- Writing career
- Language: English
- Notable work: Grange House

Sarah Blake is an American writer based in Washington D.C. Her debut novel Grange House, set in Victorian era Maine, was published in 2001. Her second, The Postmistress, a story set in Second World War Massachusetts and London, was published in 2010, and a third, The Guest Book, the story of two intertwined families in twentieth-century Germany and the U.S., appeared in 2019.

== Life ==
Blake taught school and college-level English in Colorado and New York for several years and has taught fiction workshops at various institutions. The Postmistress received a favourable review from The New York Times, which compared it to Kathryn Stockett's The Help.

== Family ==
She is married to poet Joshua Weiner.

== Bibliography ==
- Grange House (2001) Picador ISBN 0312280041
- The Postmistress (2010) Amy Einhorn Books/Putnam ISBN 0399156194
- The Guest Book (2019) Flatiron Books ISBN 9781250110251
