= Debt monetization =

Government finance

Debt monetization or monetary financing is the practice of a government borrowing money from the central bank to finance public spending instead of selling bonds to private investors or raising taxes. The central banks who buy government debt, are essentially creating new money in the process to do so. This practice is often informally and pejoratively called printing money or (net) money creation. It is prohibited in many countries, because it is considered dangerous due to the risk of creating runaway inflation.

== Forms of monetary financing ==
Monetary financing can take various forms depending on the motivating policies and purposes. The central bank can directly purchase government debt that would otherwise have been offered to public sector investors in the financial markets, or the government can simply be allowed to have a negative treasury balance. In either case, new money is created and government debt to private parties does not increase.

Taxonomy of monetary financing
	Direct	Indirect or ex-post
Non-reimbursable (permanent)	Direct monetary financing without corresponding asset on the balance-sheet	Ex-post cancellation (taken from the Latin phrase for 'after the event') or conversion of public debts held by the central bank into perpetuities.
Reimbursable (or reversible)	Purchase of sovereign bonds on primary market Credit lines or overdrafts to the government at reduced or zero interest rate	Purchase of sovereign bonds on secondary markets (quantitative easing)

=== Direct forms of monetary financing ===
In its most direct form, monetary financing would theoretically take the form of an irreversible direct transfer of money from the central bank to the government. However, in practice monetary financing is most usually done in a way that is reversible, for example by offering costless direct credit lines or overdrafts to the government. The Bank of England can do this for example through its "ways and means" facility. In these cases, a government does have a liability towards its central bank.

A second form of direct monetary financing is the purchase of government debt securities on issue (i.e. on the primary market). In this case, the central bank can in theory resell the acquired treasury bills.

Those forms of monetary financing were practised in many countries during the decades following the Second World War, for example in France and Canada.

=== Indirect forms of monetary financing ===
Quantitative easing as practised by the major central banks is not strictly speaking a form of monetary financing, due to the fact that these monetary stimulus policies are carried out indirectly (on the secondary market), and that these operations are reversible (the CB can resell the bonds to the private sector) and therefore not permanent as monetary financing. Moreover, the intention of the central bank is different: the QE programmes are not justified to finance governments, but to push down long rates in order to stimulate money creation through bank credit. The increase in the government deficit that these policies allow is presented as an unintended side effect. This is at least the legal view: for example the European Court of Justice has ruled that the programme does not violate the prohibition of monetary financing as laid down in the European Treaties.

However, it is often said that the frontiers are blurry between QE and monetary financing. Indeed, the economic effect of QE can be considered similar or even equivalent to monetary financing. Insofar as ECB QE effectively reduces the cost of indebtedness of Eurozone countries by lowering market rates, and as central banks pass on to governments the profits made on these public debt obligations, the benefit of QE policy is significant for governments. Some observers thus believe that the distinction between QE and monetary financing is hypocritical or at best very blurry.

Moreover, quantitative easing could become an ex-post monetisation of debt if the debt securities held by the central bank were to be cancelled or converted into perpetual debt, as is sometimes proposed. According to the ECB, an ex-post debt cancellation of public debt securities held under QE would clearly constitute an illegal situation of monetary financing.

== Legal prohibitions against monetary financing ==
Because the process implies coordination between the government and the central bank, debt monetization is seen as contrary to the doctrine of central bank independence. Most developed countries instituted this independence, "keep[ing] politicians [...] away from the printing presses", in order to avoid the possibility of the government, in order to increase its popularity or to achieve short-term political benefits, creating new money and risking the kind of runaway inflation seen in the German Weimar Republic or more recently in Venezuela.

In the Eurozone, Article 123 of the Lisbon Treaty explicitly prohibits the European Central Bank from financing public institutions and state governments.

In the United States, The Banking Act of 1935 prohibited the central bank from directly purchasing Treasury securities, and permitted their purchase and sale only "in the open market". In 1942, during wartime, Congress amended the Banking Act's provisions to allow purchases of government debt by the federal banks, with the total amount they'd hold "not [to] exceed $5 billion." After the war, the exemption was renewed, with time limitations, until it was allowed to expire in June 1981.

In Japan, where debt monetization is on paper prohibited, the nation's central bank "routinely" purchases approximately 70% of state debt issued each month, and owns, as of October 2018, approximately 440 trillion JP¥ or over 40% of all outstanding government bonds. The central bank purchased the bonds through the banks instead of directly, and books them as temporary holding, allowing the parties involved to argue that no debt monetization actually occurred.

The People's Bank of China (PBOC), is forbidden by the PBOC Law of 1995 to give overdrafts to government bodies, or buy government bonds directly from the government, or underwrite any other government debt securities.

Bank Indonesia (pictured) agreed to directly purchase about US$27.4 billion of government debt in July 2020

== Policy debate ==
=== Debt monetization and inflation ===
When government deficits are financed through debt monetization the outcome is an increase in the monetary base, shifting the aggregate-demand curve to the right leading to a rise in the price level (unless the money supply is infinitely elastic). When governments intentionally do this, they devalue existing stockpiles of fixed income cash flows of anyone who is holding assets based in that currency. This does not reduce the value of floating or hard assets, and has an uncertain (and potentially beneficial) impact on some equities. It benefits debtors at the expense of creditors and will result in an increase in the nominal price of real estate. This wealth transfer is clearly not a Pareto improvement but can act as a stimulus to economic growth and employment in an economy overburdened by private debt. It is in essence a "tax" and a simultaneous redistribution to debtors as the overall value of creditors' fixed income assets drop (and as the debt burden to debtors correspondingly decreases).

If the beneficiaries of this transfer are more likely to spend their gains (due to lower income and asset levels) this can stimulate demand and increase liquidity. It also decreases the value of the currency - potentially stimulating exports and decreasing imports - improving the balance of trade. Foreign owners of local currency and debt also lose money. Fixed income creditors experience decreased wealth due to a loss in spending power. This is known as "inflation tax" (or "inflationary debt relief"). Conversely, tight monetary policy which favors creditors over debtors even at the expense of reduced economic growth can also be considered a wealth transfer to holders of fixed assets from people with debt or with mostly human capital to trade (a "deflation tax").

A deficit can be the source of sustained inflation only if it is persistent rather than temporary, and if the government finances it by creating money (through monetizing the debt), rather than leaving bonds in the hands of the public.

On the other hand, economists (e.g. Adair Turner, Jordi Gali, Paul de Grauwe) are in favor of monetary financing as an emergency measure. During an exceptional circumstances, such as the situation created by the COVID-19 pandemic, the benefits of avoiding a severe depression outweighs the need to maintain monetary discipline. In addition, the policy responses to the 2007–2009 Great Recession showed that money can be injected into economies in crisis without causing inflation. An economy in recession is a "deflating" enterprise and as the quantity of money in circulation declines, economic activity naturally recedes, reinforcing collapse. Economists would say that contraction is "sticky," on the downside. Thus, deflation was a far bigger threat than inflation during the pandemic.

=== COVID-19 pandemic response ===
National responses to the COVID-19 pandemic include increasing public spending to support affected households and businesses. The resulting deficits are increasingly financed by debt that are eventually purchased by the central bank. The business publication Bloomberg estimates that the United States Federal Reserve will buy $3.5 trillion worth of bonds in 2020, mostly U.S. government bonds.

The Bank of England allowed an overdraft in the government account.

In July 2020, Bank Indonesia agreed to purchase approximately 398 trillion rupiah (US$27.4 billion) and return all the interest to the government. In addition, the central bank would cover part of the interest payments on an additional 123.46 trillion rupiah of bonds. The central bank governor Perry Warjiyo billed the decision as a one-time policy.

The economist Paul McCulley commented that despite the lack of an explicit declaration, the various policies represented the breakdown of the "church-and-state separation" between monetary and fiscal policy.
