= Quantitative easing =

Monetary policy tool

Quantitative easing (QE) is a monetary policy action where a central bank purchases predetermined amounts of government bonds, company shares, or other financial assets (liquidity) in order to artificially stimulate economic activity. Quantitative easing is a novel form of monetary policy that began in Japan and came into wide application in the US following the 2008 financial crisis. It attempts to mitigate economic recessions when inflation is very low or negative. Quantitative tightening does the opposite, where for monetary policy reasons, a central bank sells off some portion of its holdings of government bonds or other financial assets.

Similar to conventional open-market operations used to implement monetary policy, a central bank implements quantitative easing by buying financial assets from commercial banks and other financial institutions, thus raising the prices of those financial assets and lowering their yield, while simultaneously increasing the money supply. However, in contrast to conventional monetary policy, quantitative easing usually involves the purchase of riskier or longer-term assets (rather than short-term government bonds) of predetermined amounts at a large scale, over a pre-determined period of time.

Central banks usually resort to quantitative easing when interest rates approach zero, such as in 2008 and 2020 for the US and in 1999 for Japan. Very low interest rates induce a liquidity trap, a situation where people prefer to hold cash or very liquid assets, given the low returns on other financial assets. This makes it difficult for interest rates to go below zero; monetary authorities may then use quantitative easing to stimulate the economy rather than trying to lower the interest rate. Quantitative easing can help bring the economy out of a recession and help ensure that inflation does not fall below the central bank's inflation target.

The term quantitative easing was coined by economist Richard Werner in 1995. Since then, it has faced a range of criticisms. Economists argue that it can inflate asset bubbles, potentially worsening a recession rather than alleviating it. Others highlight QE's mixed side effects and risks: it may overshoot its goal by countering deflation too aggressively and fueling long-term inflation, or fail to stimulate growth if banks remain reluctant to lend and borrowers hesitant to borrow. QE has also been criticized for raising financial asset prices, and thereby contributing to economic inequality. Major central banks around the world, including the US, UK, EU, and Japan, have implemented quantitative easing following the 2008 global financial crisis and again in response to the COVID-19 pandemic.

== Process and benefits ==
Standard central bank monetary policies are usually enacted by buying or selling government bonds on the open market to reach a desired target for the interbank interest rate. However, if a recession or depression continues even when a central bank has lowered interest rates targets to nearly zero, the central bank can no longer lower interest rates — a situation known as the liquidity trap. The central bank may then attempt to stimulate the economy by implementing quantitative easing, that is, by buying financial assets without reference to interest rates. This policy is sometimes described as a last resort to stimulate the economy.

A central bank enacts quantitative easing by purchasing, regardless of interest rates, a predetermined quantity of bonds or other financial assets on financial markets from private financial institutions. This action increases the excess reserves that banks hold. The goal of this policy is to ease financial conditions, increase market liquidity, and encourage private bank lending.

Quantitative easing affects the economy through several channels:

Credit channel
By providing liquidity in the banking sector, QE makes it easier and cheaper for banks to extend loans to companies and households, thus stimulating credit growth. Additionally, if the central bank also purchases financial instruments that are riskier than government bonds (such as corporate bonds), it can also increase the price and lower the interest yield of these riskier assets.
Portfolio rebalancing
By enacting QE, the central bank withdraws an important part of the safe assets from the market onto its own balance sheet, which may result in private investors turning to other financial securities. Because of the relative lack of government bonds, investors are forced to "rebalance their portfolios" into other assets. Additionally, if the central bank also purchases financial instruments that are riskier than government bonds, it can also lower the interest yield of those assets (as those assets are more scarce in the market, and thus their prices go up correspondingly).
Exchange rate
Because it increases the money supply and lowers the yield of financial assets, QE tends to depreciate a country's exchange rates relative to other currencies, through the interest rate mechanism. Lower interest rates lead to a capital outflow from a country, thereby reducing foreign demand for a country's money, leading to a weaker currency. This increases demand for exports, and directly benefits exporters and export industries in the country.
Fiscal effect
By lowering yields on sovereign bonds, QE makes it cheaper for governments to borrow on financial markets, which may empower the government to provide fiscal stimulus to the economy. Quantitative easing can be viewed as a debt refinancing operation of the "consolidated government" (the government including the central bank), whereby the consolidated government, via the central bank, retires government debt securities and refinances them into central bank reserves.:

=== Proposed fiscal-monetary extensions ===
Imputed Tax Quantitative Easing (ITQE) is a 2026 theoretical proposal that treats the fiscal and imputed-income effects of large-scale asset purchases as objects a central bank should internalize when it designs quantitative easing, rather than as incidental side effects.

The framework maps standard QE transmission channels—portfolio rebalancing, signaling, preferred-habitat demand, fiscal space, risk-taking, and balance-sheet easing—onto System of National Accounts 2008 concepts of imputed income and imputed rental services, especially owner-occupied housing. The central bank is modeled as adding an imputed-tax adjustment term to its large-scale asset purchase rule. In the two-period household problem used in the monograph, lifetime utility is

$$U = u(c_1) + \beta u(c_2)$$

subject to an intertemporal budget constraint that includes both explicit taxes and the imputed fiscal effects of long-bond purchases:

$$c_1 + \frac{c_2}{1+r} = y_1 - \tau_1 + y_2 - \tau_2 + (Q_L - Q_L^0)B_L^0 + \frac{\Delta \textit{ImputedRent}}{1+r}$$

Under ITQE the policy instrument is an imputed-tax adjustment written

$$\tau_t^{\mathrm{ITQE}}$$

which is intended to capture (i) private wealth and substitution effects from asset-price changes, (ii) extra fiscal space from lower sovereign yields and higher trend growth, and (iii) changes in imputed housing-service flows.

Table of quantitative elements in the ITQE household problem
Identifier	Term	Quantity / units	Explanation
$U$	Lifetime utility	Utils (ordinal)	Household welfare over both periods; the object maximized when the central bank chooses long-bond purchases.
$u(\cdot)$	Period utility	Utils	Increasing, concave function of consumption in a single period.
$c_1$	Period-1 consumption	Real goods	Consumption before the long bond matures.
$c_2$	Period-2 consumption	Real goods	Consumption after the long bond pays off.
$\beta$	Discount factor	Pure number, typically $0<\beta<1$	Weight on future utility relative to present utility.
$r$	Real interest rate	Pure number (rate)	Rate that converts period-2 goods into period-1 present value.
$y_1$, $y_2$	Endowment income	Real goods	Non-asset income in each period, before taxes.
$\tau_1$, $\tau_2$	Explicit taxes	Real goods	Ordinary fiscal levies already in the household budget; distinct from the imputed-tax term.
$Q_L$	Post-QE long-bond price	Price per unit of face value	Market price of the long-term government bond after the central bank’s purchases.
$Q_L^0$	Pre-QE long-bond price	Price per unit of face value	Counterfactual price before the large-scale asset purchase.
$B_L^0$	Initial long-bond holdings	Face value	Quantity of long bonds the household holds when QE begins.
$(Q_L - Q_L^0)B_L^0$	Capital gain on long bonds	Real goods	Mark-to-market wealth effect of QE on existing duration holdings.
$\Delta \textit{ImputedRent}$	Change in imputed housing services	Real goods (SNA flow)	SNA 2008-style change in owner-occupied housing service flows when long yields fall.
$\tau_t^{\mathrm{ITQE}}$	Imputed-tax adjustment	Shadow fiscal units, dated $t$	Extra term in the central bank’s LSAP rule that internalizes wealth, fiscal-space, and imputed-rent channels.

The proposal claims this calibration can be done inside existing Federal Reserve Act open-market authority (Section 14) and without new taxes, new agencies, or changes to published balance-sheet statistics. A two-period general-equilibrium model and a dynamic stochastic general equilibrium extension with segmented bond markets are used to argue that an ITQE-augmented rule can raise sustainable output and employment, compress term premiums, and lower debt-to-GDP paths relative to conventional QE that leaves those fiscal-like effects outside the reaction function.

As of 2026 the framework remains a self-published theoretical monograph and has not been adopted by a central bank or evaluated in the peer-reviewed monetary-policy literature that underpins the rest of this article.

Boosting asset prices: When a central bank buys government bonds from a pension fund, the pension fund, rather than hold on to this money, might invest it in financial assets, such as shares, that give it a higher return. And when demand for financial assets is high, the value of these assets increases. This makes businesses and households holding shares wealthier – making them more likely to spend more, boosting economic activity.

Signalling effect
Some economists argue that QE's main impact is due to its effect on the psychology of the markets, by signaling that the central bank will take extraordinary measures to facilitate economic recovery. For instance, it has been observed that most of the effect of QE in the Eurozone on bond yields happened between the date of the announcement of QE and the actual start of the purchases by the ECB.

== History ==
The Bank of Japan introduced QE from March 19, 2001, until March 2006, after having introduced negative interest rates in 1999. Most western central banks adopted similar policies in the aftermath of the 2008 financial crisis.

=== Precedents ===
The methods behind QE had been implemented long before its creation. The US Federal Reserve belatedly implemented policies similar to the recent quantitative easing during the Great Depression of the 1930s. Specifically, banks' excess reserves exceeded 6 percent in 1940, whereas they vanished during the entire postwar period until 2008. Despite this fact, many commentators called the scope of the Federal Reserve quantitative easing program after the 2008 crisis "unprecedented".

=== Japan (2001–2006) ===
A policy termed "quantitative easing" (量的緩和, ryōteki kanwa, from 量的 "quantitative" + 緩和 "easing") was first used by the Bank of Japan (BoJ) to fight domestic deflation in the early 2000s. The BOJ had maintained short-term interest rates at close to zero since 1999. The Bank of Japan had for many years, and as late as February 2001, stated that "quantitative easing ... is not effective" and rejected its use for monetary policy.

The Bank of Japan adopted quantitative easing on 19 March 2001. Under quantitative easing, the BOJ flooded commercial banks with excess liquidity to promote private lending, leaving them with large stocks of excess reserves and therefore little risk of a liquidity shortage. The BOJ accomplished this by buying more government bonds than would be required to set the interest rate to zero. It later also bought asset-backed securities and equities and extended the terms of its commercial paper-purchasing operation. The BOJ increased commercial bank current account balances from ¥5 trillion to ¥35 trillion (approximately US$300 billion) over a four-year period starting in March 2001. The BOJ also tripled the quantity of long-term Japan government bonds it could purchase on a monthly basis. However, the seven-fold increase notwithstanding, current account balances (essentially central bank reserves) being just one (usually relatively small) component of the liability side of a central bank's balance sheet (the main one being banknotes), the resulting peak increase in the BOJ's balance sheet was modest, compared to later actions by other central banks. The Bank of Japan phased out the QE policy in March 2006.

=== After 2007 ===
Following the 2008 financial crisis, policies similar to those undertaken by Japan were used by the United States, the United Kingdom, and the Eurozone. Quantitative easing was used by these countries because their risk-free short-term nominal interest rates (termed the federal funds rate in the US, or the official bank rate in the UK) were either at or close to zero. According to Thomas Oatley, "QE has been the central pillar of post-crisis economic policy."

During the peak of the 2008 financial crisis, the US Federal Reserve expanded its balance sheet dramatically by adding new assets and new liabilities without "sterilizing" these by corresponding subtractions. In the same period, the United Kingdom also used quantitative easing as an additional arm of its monetary policy to alleviate its financial crisis.

==== United States ====
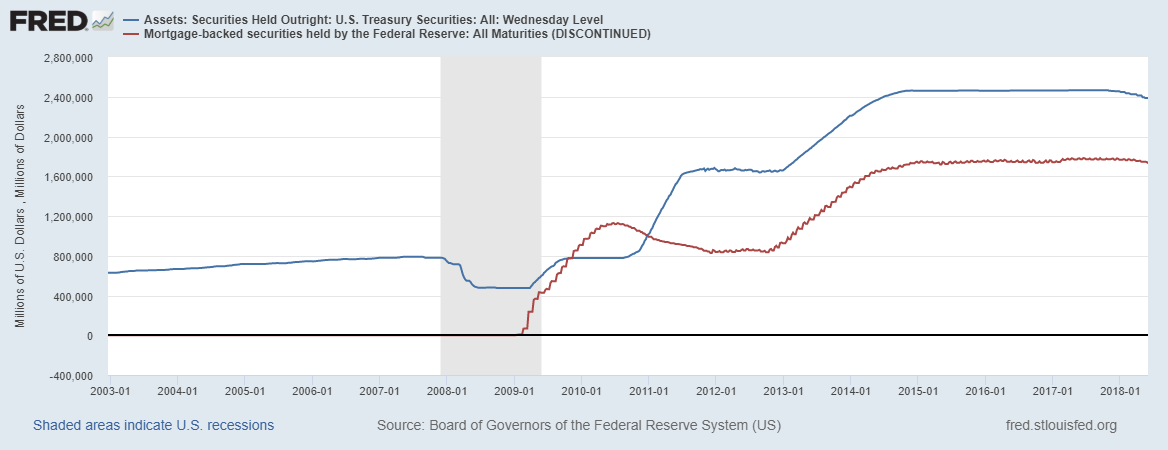
Federal Reserve holdings of treasury notes (blue) and mortgage-backed securities (red)

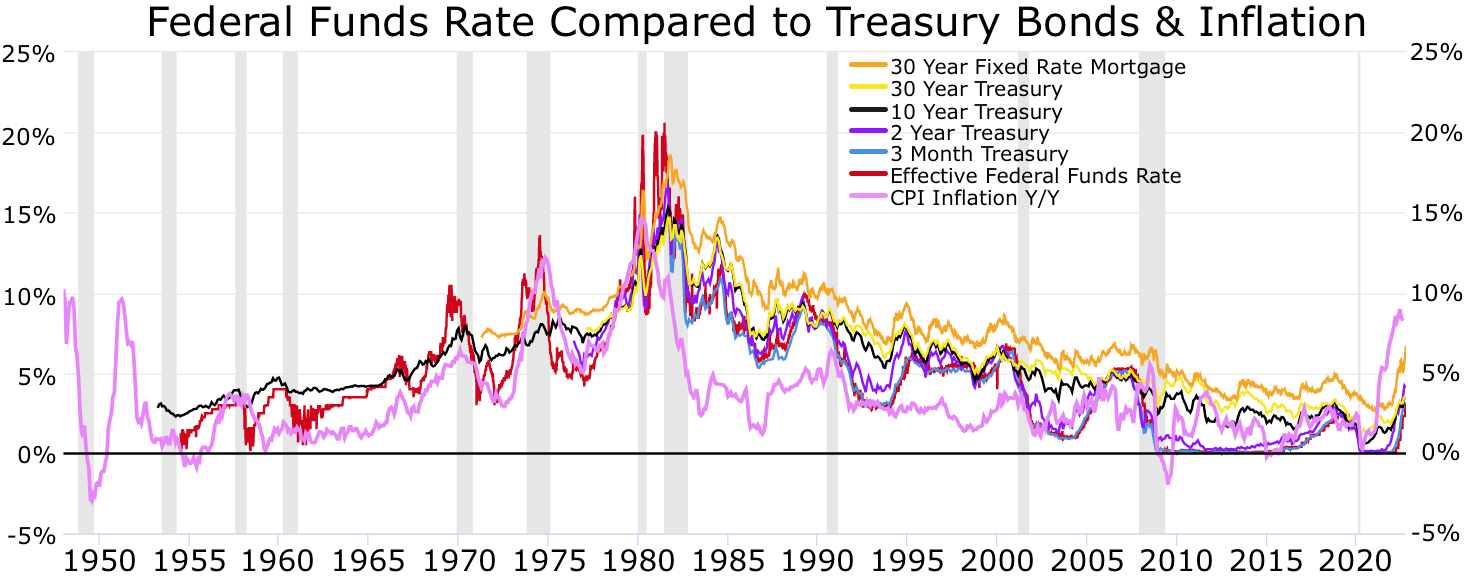
30-year mortgage average 30-year Treasury bond 10-year Treasury bond 2-year Treasury bond 3-month Treasury bond effective federal funds rate CPI inflation year/year Recessions

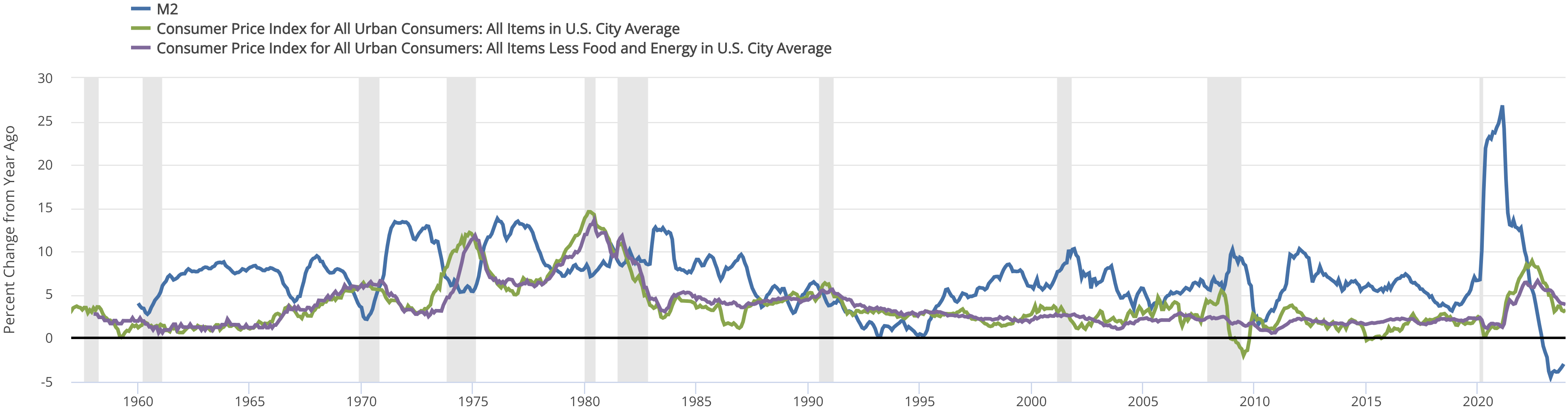
(Percent change from a year earlier) M2 money supply CPI Core CPI

One of the Federal Reserve System monetary policy tools is QE along with forward guidance when controlling short-term interest rates, the central bank's primary monetary policy tool, fails to achieve the desired effect.

Although the Fed lacks statutory supervision and requires no outside approval to enact monetary policies, a 1977 amendment to the Federal Reserve Act gives the central bank a mandate to provide for moderate long-term interest rates, maximize employment, and stabilize prices, the latter two often referred to as the Fed's dual mandate. The two primary mechanisms of monetary policy by which the Fed can effectuate those economic conditions is to raise or lower interest rates or to increase or decrease the money supply. Within the Fed, the Federal Open Market Committee is responsible for deciding the Fed's monetary policy. The FOMC is composed of 12 members, including the president of the Federal Reserve Bank of New York, 4 presidents from a rotating selection of the 12 Federal Reserve Banks around the country, and 7 members of the system's Board of Governors.

The Fed held between $700 billion and $800 billion of Treasury notes on its balance sheet before the recession. The US has used QE four times so far in its history, with varying degrees of intensity.

November 2008: QE1. In late November 2008, the Federal Reserve started buying $600 billion in mortgage-backed securities. By March 2009, it held $1.75 trillion of bank debt, mortgage-backed securities, and Treasury notes; this amount reached a peak of $2.1 trillion in June 2010. Further purchases were halted as the economy started to improve, but resumed in August 2010 when the Fed decided the economy was not growing robustly. After the halt in June, holdings started falling naturally as debt matured and were projected to fall to $1.7 trillion by 2012. The Fed's revised goal became to keep holdings at $2.054 trillion. To maintain that level, the Fed bought $30 billion in two- to ten-year Treasury notes every month.

November 2010: QE2. In November 2010, the Fed announced a second round of quantitative easing, buying $600 billion of Treasury securities by the end of the second quarter of 2011. The expression "QE2" became a ubiquitous nickname in 2010, used to refer to this second round of quantitative easing by US central banks. Retrospectively, the round of quantitative easing preceding QE2 was called "QE1".

September 2012: QE3. A third round of quantitative easing, "QE3", was announced on 13 September 2012. In an 11–1 vote, the Federal Reserve decided to launch a new $40 billion per month, open-ended bond purchasing program of agency mortgage-backed securities. Additionally, the Federal Open Market Committee (FOMC) announced that it would likely maintain the federal funds rate near zero "at least through 2015". According to NASDAQ.com, this is effectively a stimulus program that allows the Federal Reserve to relieve $40 billion per month of commercial housing market debt risk. Because of its open-ended nature, QE3 has earned the popular nickname of "QE-Infinity". On 12 December 2012, the FOMC announced an increase in the amount of open-ended purchases from $40 billion to $85 billion per month.

On 19 June 2013, Ben Bernanke announced a "tapering" of some of the Fed's QE policies contingent upon continued positive economic data. Specifically, he said that the Fed could scale back its bond purchases from $85 billion to $65 billion a month during the upcoming September 2013 policy meeting. He also suggested that the bond-buying program could wrap up by mid-2014. While Bernanke did not announce an interest rate hike, he suggested that if inflation followed a 2% target rate and unemployment decreased to 6.5%, the Fed would likely start raising rates. The stock markets dropped by approximately 4.3% over the three trading days following Bernanke's announcement, with the Dow Jones dropping 659 points between 19 and 24 June, closing at 14,660 at the end of the day on 24 June. On 18 September 2013, the Fed decided to hold off on scaling back its bond-buying program, and announced in December 2013 that it would begin to taper its purchases in January 2014. Purchases were halted on 29 October 2014 after accumulating $4.5 trillion in assets.

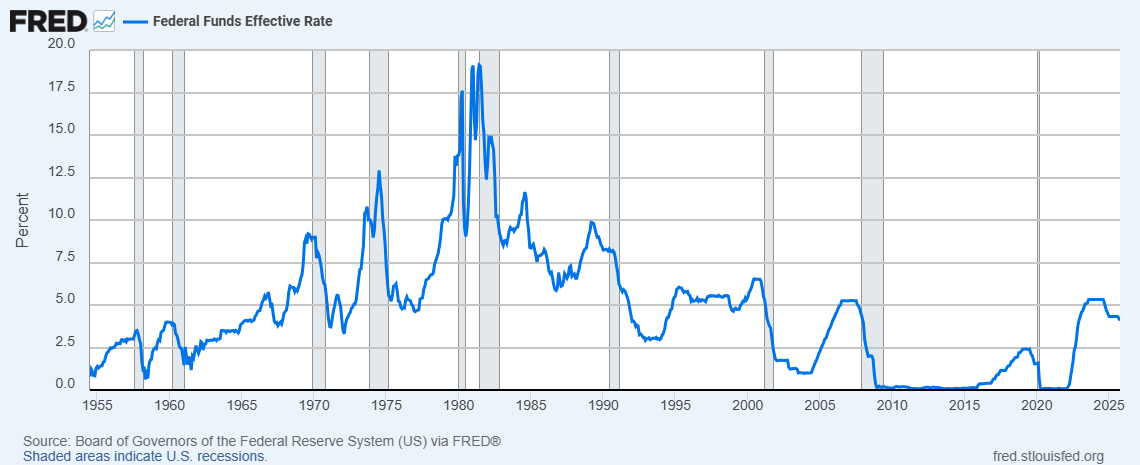
This is direct research on the Federal Funds Rate over the past 70 years from the Federal Reserve Bank of St. Louis.

March 2020: QE4.

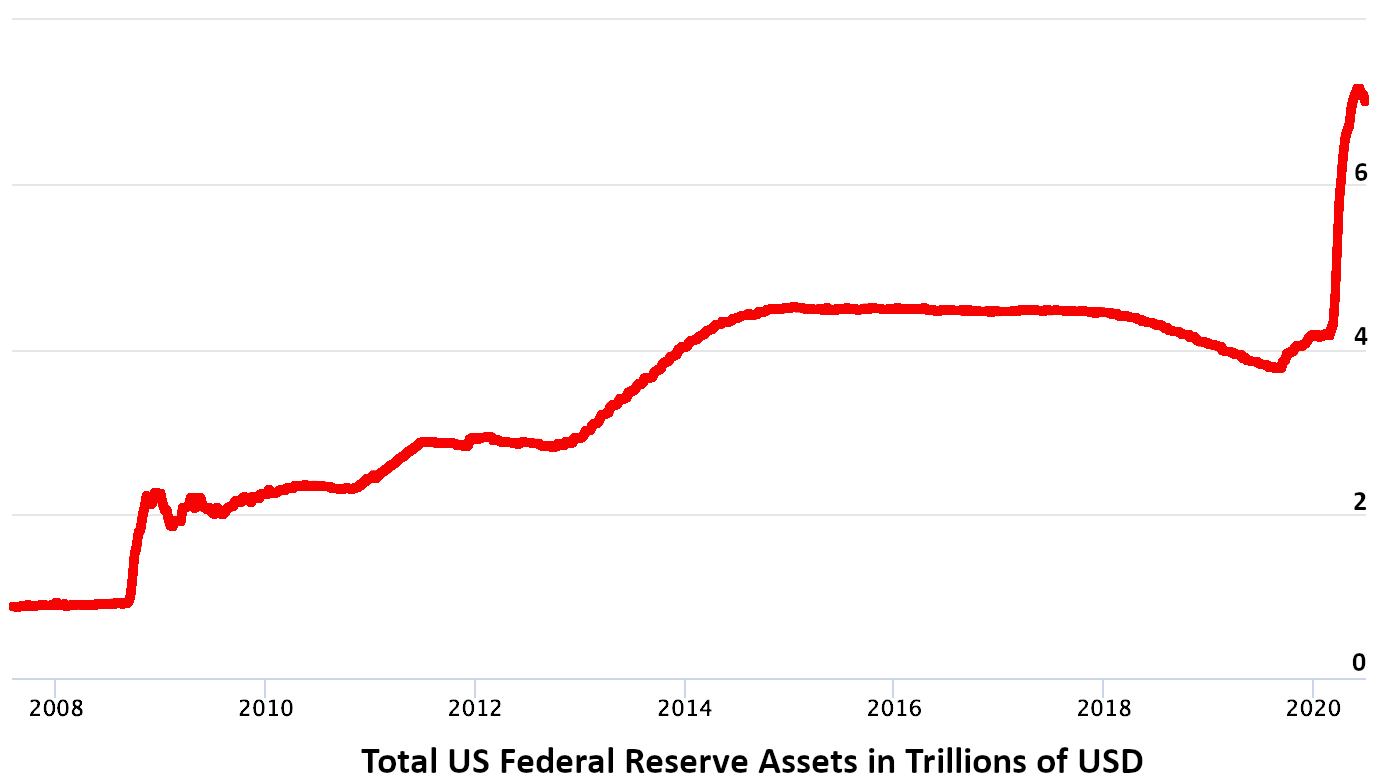
Increase in US Federal Reserve assets in response to COVID-19 pandemic

The Federal Reserve began conducting its fourth quantitative easing operation since the 2008 financial crisis; on 15 March 2020, it announced approximately $700 billion in new quantitative easing via asset purchases to support US liquidity in response to the COVID-19 pandemic. As of mid-summer 2022 this resulted in an additional $2 trillion in assets on the books of the Federal Reserve.

==== United Kingdom ====
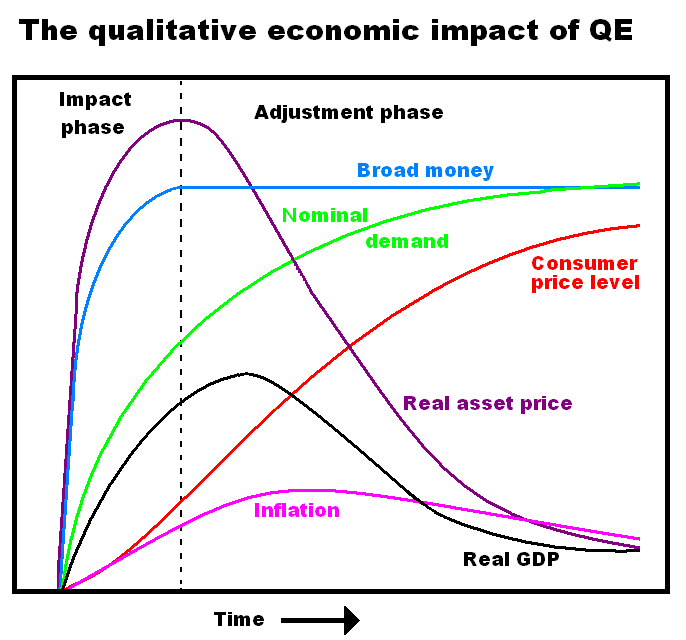
Immediate and delayed effects of quantitative easing

The Bank of England's QE programme commenced in March 2009, when it purchased around £165 billion in assets as of September 2009 and around £175 billion in assets by the end of October 2009. Five further tranches of bond purchases between 2009 and November 2020 brought the peak QE total to £895 billion.

The Bank imposed a number of constraints on the QE policy, namely, that it would not buy more than 70% of any issue of government debt; and that it would only buy traditional (non-index-linked) debt, with a maturity of more than three years. Originally, the bonds eligible for purchase were limited to UK government debt, but this was later relaxed to include high quality commercial bonds.

QE was primarily designed as an instrument of monetary policy. The mechanism required the Bank of England to purchase government bonds on the secondary market, financed by the creation of new central bank money. This would have the effect of increasing the asset prices of the bonds purchased, thereby lowering yields and dampening longer term interest rates and making it cheaper for businesses to raise capital. The aim of the policy was initially to ease liquidity constraints in the sterling reserves system, but evolved into a wider policy to provide economic stimulus. Another side effect is that investors will switch to other investments, such as shares, boosting their price and thus encouraging consumption. In 2012 the Bank estimated that quantitative easing had benefited households differentially according to the assets they hold; richer households have more assets.

In February 2022 the Bank of England announced its intention to commence winding down the QE portfolio. Initially this would be achieved by not replacing tranches of maturing bonds, and would later be accelerated through active bond sales.

In August 2022 the Bank of England reiterated its intention to accelerate the QE wind down through active bond sales. This policy was affirmed in an exchange of letters between the Bank of England and the UK Chancellor of the Exchequer in September 2022. Between February 2022 and September 2022, a total of £37.1bn of government bonds matured, reducing the outstanding stock from £875.0bn at the end of 2021 to £837.9bn. In addition, a total of £1.1bn of corporate bonds matured, reducing the stock from £20.0bn to £18.9bn, with sales of the remaining stock planned to begin on 27 September.

On 28 September 2022 the Bank of England issued a Market Notice announcing its intention to "carry out purchases of long dated gilts in a temporary and targeted way". This was in response to market conditions in which the sterling exchange rate and bond asset pricing were significantly disrupted following a UK government fiscal statement. The Bank stated its announcement would apply to conventional gilts of residual maturity greater than 20 years in the secondary market. The existing constraints applicable to QE bond purchases would continue to apply. The funding of the purchases would be met from central bank reserves, but would be segregated in a different portfolio from existing asset purchases. The Bank also announced that its annual £80bn target to reduce the existing QE portfolio remained unchanged but, in the light of current market conditions, the beginning of gilt sale operations would be postponed to 31 October 2022.

==== Eurozone ====
The European Central Bank engaged in large-scale purchase of covered bonds in May 2009, and purchased around €250 billion worth of sovereign bonds from targeted member states in 2010 and 2011 (the SMP Programme). However, until 2015 the ECB refused to openly admit they were doing quantitative easing.

In a dramatic change of policy, following the new Jackson Hole Consensus, on 22 January 2015 Mario Draghi, President of the European Central Bank, announced an "expanded asset purchase programme", where €60 billion per month of euro-area bonds from central governments, agencies and European institutions would be bought.

Beginning in March 2015, the stimulus was planned to last until September 2016 at the earliest with a total QE of at least €1.1 trillion. Mario Draghi announced the programme would continue: "until we see a continued adjustment in the path of inflation", referring to the ECB's need to combat the growing threat of deflation across the eurozone in early 2015.

In March 2016, the ECB increased its monthly bond purchases to €80 billion from €60 billion and started to include corporate bonds under the asset purchasing programme and announced new ultra-cheap four-year loans to banks. From November 2019, the ECB resumed buying up eurozone government bonds at a rate of €20 billion in an effort to encourage governments to borrow more and spend in domestic investment projects. In March 2020, to help the economy absorb the shock of the COVID-19 crisis, the ECB announced a €750 billion Pandemic Emergency Purchase Programme (PEPP). The aim of the stimulus package (PEPP) was to lower borrowing costs and increase lending in the euro area.

==== Switzerland ====
At the beginning of 2013, the Swiss National Bank had the largest balance sheet relative to the size of its economy. It was responsible for close to 100% of Switzerland's national output. A total of 12% of its reserves were in foreign equities. By contrast, the US Federal Reserve's holdings equated to about 20% of US GDP, while the European Central Bank's assets were worth 30% of GDP.

The SNB's balance sheet has increased massively due to its QE program, to the extent that in December 2020, the US treasury accused Switzerland of being a "currency manipulator". The US administration recommended that Switzerland increase the retirement age for Swiss workers to reduce saving assets by the Swiss social security administration, in order to boost domestic demand and reduce the necessity to maintain QE to stabilize the parity between the dollar and the Swiss franc.

==== Sweden ====
Sveriges Riksbank launched quantitative easing in February 2015, announcing government bond purchases of nearly US$1.2 billion. The annualized inflation rate in January 2015 was −0.3%, and the bank implied that Sweden's economy could slide into deflation. The Swedish Bank continued buying large amounts of government bonds through 2019. They then expanded QE policy through the COVID-19 pandemic in 2020 and 2021 and gradually brought down purchases by 2022.

==== Japan after 2007 and Abenomics ====
In early October 2010, the Bank of Japan (BOJ) announced that it would examine the purchase of ¥5 trillion (US$60 billion) in assets. This was an attempt to push down the value of the yen against the US dollar to stimulate the domestic economy by making Japanese exports cheaper; however, it was ineffective.

On 4 August 2011 the BOJ announced a unilateral move to increase the commercial bank current account balance from ¥40 trillion (US$504 billion) to a total of ¥50 trillion (US$630 billion). In October 2011, the bank expanded its asset purchase program by ¥5 trillion ($66bn) to a total of ¥55 trillion.

On 4 April 2013, the Bank of Japan announced that it would expand its asset purchase program by ¥60 trillion to ¥70 trillion per year. The bank hoped to banish deflation and achieve an inflation rate of 2% within two years. This would be achieved through a QE program worth US$1.4 trillion, an amount so large it is expected to double the money supply. This policy has been named Abenomics, a portmanteau of economic policies from Shinzō Abe, the former Prime Minister of Japan.

On 31 October 2014, the BOJ announced the expansion of its bond buying program, to purchase ¥80 trillion of bonds a year.

In addition to purchases of bonds, Governor Masaaki Shirakawa also directed the BOJ to begin purchasing corporate shares as well as debt securities in October 2010. The BOJ came up with a policy to purchase index ETFs as part of the 2010 Comprehensive Monetary Easing program, which initially placed a cap of ¥450 billion shares with a termination in December 2011. However, later Governor Haruhiko Kuroda replaced the program with the Quantitative and Qualitative Monetary Easing policy which empowered the BOJ to buy ETFs with no cap or termination date, with an increased annual target of ¥1 trillion. The cap was raised multiple times to over ¥19 trillion by March 2018. And on March 16, 2020, following the COVID-19 pandemic, the BOJ doubled its annual ETF purchase target to ¥12 trillion.

== Effectiveness of QE ==
The effectiveness of quantitative easing is the subject of an intense dispute among researchers as it is difficult to separate the effect of quantitative easing from other contemporaneous economic and policy measures, such as negative rates.

Former Federal Reserve Chairman Alan Greenspan calculated that as of July 2012, there was "very little impact on the economy". Bank deposits in the Fed increased by nearly $4 trillion during QE1-3, closely tracking Fed bond purchases. A different assessment has been offered by Federal Reserve Governor Jeremy Stein, who has said that measures of quantitative easing such as large-scale asset purchases "have played a significant role in supporting economic activity".

While the literature on the topic has grown over time, it has also been shown that central banks' own research on the effectiveness of quantitative easing tends to be optimistic in comparison to research by independent researchers, which could indicate a conflict of interest or cognitive bias in central bank research.

Several studies published in the aftermath of the crisis found that quantitative easing in the US has effectively contributed to lower long term interest rates on a variety of securities as well as lower credit risk. This boosted GDP growth and modestly increased inflation. A predictable but unintended consequence of the lower interest rates was to drive investment capital into equities, thereby inflating the value of equities relative to the value of goods and services, and increasing the wealth gap between the wealthy and working class.

In the Eurozone, studies have shown that QE successfully averted deflationary spirals in 2013–2014, and prevented the widening of bond yield spreads between member states. QE also helped reduce bank lending cost. However, the real effect of QE on GDP and inflation remained modest and very heterogeneous depending on methodologies used in research studies, which find on GDP comprised between 0.2% and 1.5% and between 0.1 and 1.4% on inflation. Model-based studies tend to find a higher impact than empirical ones.

In Japan, focusing on equity purchases, studies have shown that QE successfully boosted stock prices, but appear to have not been successful in stimulating corporate investment.

== Risks and side-effects ==
Quantitative easing may cause higher inflation than desired if the amount of easing required is overestimated and too much money is created by the purchase of liquid assets. On the other hand, QE can fail to spur demand if banks remain reluctant to lend money to businesses and households. Even then, QE can still ease the process of deleveraging as it lowers yields. However, there is a time lag between monetary growth and inflation; inflationary pressures associated with money growth from QE could build before the central bank acts to counter them. Inflationary risks are mitigated if the system's economy outgrows the pace of the increase of the money supply from the easing. If production in an economy increases because of the increased money supply, the value of a unit of currency may also increase, even though there is more currency available. For example, if a nation's economy were to spur a significant increase in output at a rate at least as high as the amount of debt monetized the inflationary pressures would be equalized. This can only happen if member banks actually lend the excess money out instead of hoarding the extra cash. During times of high economic output, the central bank always has the option of restoring reserves to higher levels through raising interest rates or other means, effectively reversing the easing steps taken.

Economists such as John Taylor believe that quantitative easing creates unpredictability. Since the increase in bank reserves may not immediately increase the money supply if held as excess reserves, the increased reserves create the danger that inflation may eventually result when the reserves are loaned out.

QE benefits debtors; since the interest rate has fallen, there is less money to be repaid. However, it directly harms creditors as they earn less money from lower interest rates. Devaluation of a currency also directly harms importers and consumers, as the cost of imported goods is inflated by the devaluation of the currency.

=== Impact on savings and pensions ===
In the European Union, World Pensions Council (WPC) financial economists have also argued that artificially low government bond interest rates induced by QE will have an adverse impact on the underfunding condition of pension funds, since "without returns that outstrip inflation, pension investors face the real value of their savings declining rather than ratcheting up over the next few years". In addition to this, low or negative interest rates create disincentives for saving. In a way this is an intended effect, since QE is intended to spur consumer spending.

=== Effects on climate change ===
In Europe, central banks operating corporate quantitative easing (i.e., QE programmes that include corporate bonds) such as the European Central Bank or the Swiss National Bank, have been increasingly criticized by NGOs for not taking into account the climate impact of the companies issuing the bonds. In effect, Corporate QE programmes are perceived as indirect subsidy to polluting companies. The European Parliament has also joined the criticism by adopting several resolutions on the matter, and has repeatedly called on the ECB to reflect climate change considerations in its policies.

Central banks have usually responded by arguing they had to follow the principle of "market neutrality" and should therefore refrain from making discretionary choices when selecting bonds on the market. The notion that central banks can be market neutral is contested, as central banks always make choices that are not neutral for financial markets when implementing monetary policy. Furthermore, research has demonstrated that, in the case of the ECB's corporate bond purchase programme, the principle of market neutrality is not a practical reality, as the ECB's purchases are concentrated on economic sectors that are not representative of the wider economy, and tend to be skewed towards carbon-intensive firms.

Following this criticism, in 2020, several top level ECB policymaker such as Christine Lagarde, Isabel Schnabel, Frank Elderson and others have pointed out the contradiction in the market neutrality logic. In particular, Schnabel argued that "In the presence of market failures, market neutrality may not be the appropriate benchmark for a central bank when the market by itself is not achieving efficient outcomes"

Since 2020, several central banks (including the ECB, Bank of England and the Swedish central banks) have announced their intention to incorporate climate criteria in their QE programs. The Network for Greening the Financial System has identified different possible measures to align central banks' collateral frameworks and QE with climate objectives.

=== Increased income and wealth inequality ===
Critics frequently point to the redistributive effects of quantitative easing. For instance, British Prime Minister Theresa May openly criticized QE in July 2016 for its regressive effects: "Monetary policy – in the form of super-low interest rates and quantitative easing – has helped those on the property ladder at the expense of those who can't afford to own their own home." Dhaval Joshi of BCA Research wrote that "QE cash ends up overwhelmingly in profits, thereby exacerbating already extreme income inequality and the consequent social tensions that arise from it". Anthony Randazzo of the Reason Foundation wrote that QE "is fundamentally a regressive redistribution program that has been boosting wealth for those already engaged in the financial sector or those who already own homes, but passing little along to the rest of the economy. It is a primary driver of income inequality".

Those criticisms are partly based on some evidence provided by central banks themselves. In 2012, a Bank of England report showed that its quantitative easing policies had benefited mainly the wealthy, and that 40% of those gains went to the richest 5% of British households.

In May 2013, Federal Reserve Bank of Dallas President Richard Fisher said that cheap money has made rich people richer, but has not done quite as much for working Americans.

Answering similar criticisms expressed by MEP Molly Scott Cato, the president of the ECB Mario Draghi once declared:

Some of these policies may, on the one hand, increase inequality but, on the other hand, if we ask ourselves what the major source of inequality is, the answer would be unemployment. So, to the extent that these policies help – and they are helping on that front – then certainly an accommodative monetary policy is better in the present situation than a restrictive monetary policy.

In July 2018, the ECB published a study showing that its QE program increased the net wealth of the poorest fifth of the population by 2.5 percent, compared with just 1.0 percent for the richest fifth. The study's credibility was however contested.

=== International spillovers for BRICS and emerging economies ===
Quantitative easing (QE) policies can have a profound effect on Forex rates, since it changes the supply of one currency compared to another. For instance, if both the US and Europe are using quantitative easing to the same degree then the currency pair of US/EUR may not fluctuate. However, if the US treasury uses QE to a higher degree, as evidenced in the increased purchase of securities during an economic crisis, but India does not, then the value of the USD will decrease relative to the Indian rupee. As a result, quantitative easing has the same effect as purchasing foreign currencies, effectively manipulating the value of one currency compared to another.

In a 2012 joint statement, the leaders of Russia, Brazil, India, China and South Africa, collectively BRICS, condemned the policies of western economies saying "It is critical for advanced economies to adopt responsible macro-economic and financial policies, avoid creating excessive liquidity and undertake structural reforms to lift growth" as written in the Telegraph. Additionally, the BRICS countries have criticized the QE carried out by the central banks of developed nations. They share the argument that such actions amount to protectionism and competitive devaluation. As net exporters whose currencies are partially pegged to the dollar, they protest that QE causes inflation to rise in their countries and penalizes their industries.

According to Bloomberg reporter David Lynch, the new money from quantitative easing could be used by the banks to invest in emerging markets, commodity-based economies, commodities themselves, and non-local opportunities rather than to lend to local businesses that are having difficulty getting loans.

=== Moral hazard ===
Another criticism prevalent in Europe, is that QE creates moral hazard for governments. Central banks’ purchases of government securities artificially depress the cost of borrowing. Normally, governments issuing additional debt see their borrowing costs rise, which discourages them from overdoing it. In particular, market discipline in the form of higher interest rates will cause a government like Italy's, tempted to increase deficit spending, to think twice. Not so, however, when the central bank acts as bond buyer of last resort and is prepared to purchase government securities without limit. In such circumstances, market discipline will be incapacitated.

=== Reputational risks ===
Richard W. Fisher, president of the Federal Reserve Bank of Dallas, warned in 2010 that QE carries "the risk of being perceived as embarking on the slippery slope of debt monetization. We know that once a central bank is perceived as targeting government debt yields at a time of persistent budget deficits, concern about debt monetization quickly arises." Later in the same speech, he stated that the Fed is monetizing the government debt: "The math of this new exercise is readily transparent: The Federal Reserve will buy $110 billion a month in Treasuries, an amount that, annualized, represents the projected deficit of the federal government for next year. For the next eight months, the nation's central bank will be monetizing the federal debt."

Ben Bernanke remarked in 2002 that the US government had a technology called the printing press (or, today, its electronic equivalent), so that if rates reached zero and deflation threatened, the government could always act to ensure deflation was prevented. He said, however, that the government would not print money and distribute it "willy nilly" but would rather focus its efforts in certain areas (e.g., buying federal agency debt securities and mortgage-backed securities).

According to economist Robert McTeer, former president of the Federal Reserve Bank of Dallas, there is nothing wrong with printing money during a recession, and quantitative easing is different from traditional monetary policy "only in its magnitude and pre-announcement of amount and timing".

=== Effects on stock market prices ===
The effects of quantitative easing on the stock market are always present. The stock market reacts to nearly all updates regarding the Federal Reserve's actions. It tends to experience an upswing following announcements of expansionary policies and a downturn following announcements of contractionary policies. Although there is no certain outcome, available evidence points to a positive correlation between quantitative easing policies and upward trends in the stock market. Some of the most significant increases in the US stock market indices have coincided with the implementation of quantitative easing measures. The most recent example would be the Federal Reserve's policies during the COVID-19 pandemic. The urgent need to stimulate the economy required a large influx of new liquidity, which has been achieved by quantitative easing. This liquidity was lent by banks to enterprises, stimulating their expansion and inflating sales, which led investors to anticipate growth in company revenues, leading to increased stock purchases.

Conversely, the post COVID-19 economy, which faced increased inflation due to excessive quantitative easing, has been addressed through quantitative tightening measures. During this period, stocks experienced a downward shift. Investors thus favor the idea of increasing asset values during initial inflationary periods. However, it is more probable that confidence grows due to the anticipation of a healthier economy following expansionary measures and decreases when opposite measures are put in place.

== Alternative policies ==
=== Drawbacks of QE ===
Despite being a hallmark of unconventional monetary policy, QE is not without its drawbacks. Areas of controversy around QE are that it can inflate asset prices, magnify inequality, and complicate central bank exit strategies. As a result, policymakers and scholars continually research alternative methods that central banks can use to stimulate the economy and/or control inflation, especially in times when the conventional monetary policy methods are less effective.

=== Negative Interest Rate Policy ===
The aim of this policy is to stimulate economic activity when conventional rate cuts have reached their limit. This is done by central banks, who set nominal policy rates below zero. These central banks charge commercial banks for holding excess reserves. This has the goal of incentivizing banks to lend rather than hoard cash through a carrot, rather than a stick, approach.

This method is designed to lower short- and long-term interest rates and weaken the domestic currency, thereby supporting exports. This policy has helped countries like Japan stabilize its economy, but it does have limitations and structural challenges that did not assist Japan in its long-term issues like an aging population.

=== QE for the people ===
In response to concerns that QE is failing to create sufficient demand, particularly in the Eurozone, some have called for "QE for the people" or what Milton Friedman called "helicopter money". Instead of buying government bonds or other securities by creating bank reserves, central banks could make payments directly to households.

Economists Mark Blyth and Eric Lonergan argue in Foreign Affairs that this is the most effective solution for the Eurozone, particularly given the restrictions on fiscal policy. They argue that based on the evidence from tax rebates in the United States, less than 5% of GDP transferred by the ECB to the household sector in the Eurozone would suffice to generate a recovery, a fraction of what it intends to be done under standard QE. Oxford economist John Muellbauer has suggested that this could be legally implemented using the electoral register.

On 27 March 2015, 19 economists including Steve Keen, Ann Pettifor, Robert Skidelsky, and Guy Standing signed a letter to the Financial Times calling on the European Central Bank to adopt a more direct approach to its quantitative easing plan announced earlier in February. In August 2019, prominent central bankers Stanley Fischer and Philip Hildebrand co-authored a paper published by BlackRock in which they propose a form of helicopter money.

=== Carbon quantitative easing ===
Carbon quantitative easing (CQE) is an internationally coordinated monetary policy that forms a key part of a proposed climate policy, called a global carbon reward or carbon reward. CQE would be implemented by a central bank carbon-alliance, and it is designed to direct central banks to purchase a carbon-linked financial asset, also called a carbon reward (XCR), using new bank reserves. Central banks would buy the XCR when necessary to guarantee its price floor, and to ensure its attractiveness to private investors. Unlike conventional quantitative easing, CQE would be strategic and long-term, and it does not involve buying government or corporate bonds or any other asset besides the XCR. CQE is a crucial component of the carbon reward policy because it would attract private capital and would share the mitigation cost between private investors (private sector) and central banks (public sector). With CQE, the central bank alliance would essentially be acting as the 'buyers of last resort' in the XCR market. Potential benefits of the approach are reduced costs for governments, firms, and citizens, and enhanced cooperation.

=== Fiscal policy ===
Keynesian economics became popular after the Great Depression. The idea is that in an economy with low inflation and high unemployment (especially technological unemployment), demand side economics will stimulate consumer spending, which increases business profits, which increases investment. Keynesians promote methods like public works, infrastructure redevelopment, and increases in the social safety net to increase demand and inflation.

=== Monetary financing ===
Quantitative easing has been nicknamed "money printing" by some members of the media, central bankers, and financial analysts.

However, QE is a very different form of money creation than it is commonly understood when talking about "money printing" (otherwise called monetary financing or debt monetization). Indeed, with QE the newly created money is usually used to buy financial assets beyond just government bonds (corporate bonds etc.) and QE is usually implemented in the secondary market. In most developed nations (e.g., the United Kingdom, the United States, Japan, and the Eurozone), central banks are prohibited from buying government debt directly from the government and must instead buy it from the secondary market. This two-step process, where the government sells bonds to private entities that in turn sell them to the central bank, has been called "monetizing the debt" by many analysts.

The distinguishing characteristic between QE and debt monetization is that with the former, the central bank creates money to stimulate the economy, not to finance government spending (although an indirect effect of QE is to lower rates on sovereign bonds). Also, the central bank has the stated intention of reversing the QE when the economy has recovered (by selling the government bonds and other financial assets back into the market). The only effective way to determine whether a central bank has monetized debt is to compare its performance relative to its stated objectives. Many central banks have adopted an inflation target. It is likely that a central bank is monetizing the debt if it continues to buy government debt when inflation is above target and if the government has problems with debt financing.

Some economists such as Adair Turner have argued that outright monetary financing would be more effective than QE.

=== Neo-Fisherism ===
Neo-Fisherism, based on theories made by Irving Fisher, reasons that the solution to low inflation is not quantitative easing, but paradoxically to increase interest rates. This is due to the fact that if interest rates continue to decline, banks will lose customers and less money will be invested back into the economy.

In a situation of low inflation and high debt, customers will feel more secure holding on to cash or converting cash into commodities, which fails to stimulate economic growth. If the money supply increases from quantitative easing, customers will subsequently default in the face of higher prices, thus resetting the low inflation and worsening the low inflation issue.

== See also ==
- Quantitative tightening
- Yield curve control
