= Global carbon reward =

Proposed climate action and monetary policy

The global carbon reward (or carbon reward) is a proposed international policy for financing the rapid decarbonisation of the world economy and scaling-up carbon dioxide removal (CDR) to avoid dangerous climate change. The policy is market-based and designed to offer proportional financial rewards for carbon dioxide removal (CDR) and adaptive financial rewards for conventional greenhouse gas (GHG) mitigation (i.e. GHG emissions reductions and avoidance). The policy is unconventional because it would offer positive financial incentives, called carbon rewards (XCR), that are valorised with a financial mechanism that does not impose direct costs on governments, firms, or citizens.

== Background ==
=== Market failure in carbon emissions ===
Since the start of the United Nations Framework Convention on Climate Change (UNFCCC) in 1992, the atmospheric concentration of carbon dioxide (CO_{2})—a dominant anthropogenic GHG—has risen steadily, as shown by the Keeling Curve. Despite numerous Conference of the Parties (COP) meetings and several treaties, CO_{2} and other GHG emissions have continued at dangerously high levels.

A major hurdle to a rapid clean energy transition and global economic decarbonisation, is a significant gap in available climate finance. According to a study of renewable energy systems by ARENA, the financial shortfall for achieving the goals of the Paris Agreement is about US $27 trillion for the 2016-2050 period. The International Energy Agency (IEA) estimate that investments in clean energy will need to increase to about US $5 trillion per year by 2030 in order to achieve net-zero carbon emissions by 2050.

Further complicating the economics of climate change is the possibility that cumulative residual CO_{2} emissions from fossil fuels could reach 850–1,150 GtCO_{2} for the period 2016–2100 even if stringent policies and carbon taxes are implemented. For these and other reasons there is an apparent need for new policies that can accelerate the transition to low-carbon energy systems and finance large-scale CDR.

=== Policy initiative and history ===
The shortfall in climate finance inspired Delton Chen, a civil engineer, to found a climate policy initiative in 2014 with the goal of developing a new policy that combines market and monetary mechanisms. Seminal ideas for the policy first appeared at the 2015 Earth System Governance conference, Canberra, and in MIT's Climate Co-Lab competitions where the seminal policy was awarded two prizes. The seminal policy was first published in 2017 by Delton Chen, Joël van der Beek, and Jonathan Cloud to address the 2015 Paris Agreement. The policy, in its formative years, was called the Global 4C Risk Mitigation Policy, where 4C is an acronym that stands for complementary currencies for climate change.

Between 2017–2019, the policy and related terminology were modified and refined. Chen and his colleagues published two policy papers and in 2018 Guglielmo Zappalà wrote an undergraduate thesis that examined the role of central banks in responding to climate change with monetary policy and macro-prudential regulation. In 2019, Chen described the carbon reward policy in terms of a central bank remit and open-market operations, and the possible application of blockchain technologies.

In 2021 the policy initiative was renamed the Global Carbon Reward (GCR) and the GCR website was launched on World Environment Day 2021. From 2021 onwards, the GCR initiative has been fiscally managed by Inquiring Systems, Inc., a 501(c)(3) organisation. The policy initiative has capitalised letters, while the policy's generic name (carbon reward) is written in lower-case.

Between 2020-2025, the carbon reward policy was imprecisely defined because it was only presented in the grey literature and the policy details were evolving. During these years, the market instrument of the policy was called a carbon currency (XCC).

In 2022, Sylvan Lutz wrote a masters thesis, comparing the relative benefits of carbon taxes and carbon rewards in fossil fuel exporting regions. In October 2025, Delton Chen elucidated the carbon reward policy in a working paper. Chen's 2025 working paper is a milestone in the policy's development by providing technical definitions, clear terminology, and economic justifications based on an expanded economic framework. The market instrument for the policy was also renamed carbon reward (XCR) to avoid confusion with currencies (i.e. the XCR is not a currency). Chen's expanded economic framework contextualised the market failure in GHGs in terms of climate damages, systemic risks, and market policies. This expanded framework combines the economic concepts of Arthur Cecil Pigou and Ronald Coase with new economic concepts introduced by Chen for responding to the systemic risks to the carbon cycle.

=== Popular culture ===
The American science fiction writer, Kim Stanley Robinson, embraced the idea of a carbon coin in his climate change novel The Ministry for the Future. The novel portrays a series of events that lead to the establishment of a transnational organisation that is mandated to deploy carbon coins to address the Paris Agreement. The author's inspiration for the carbon coin concept derives from the carbon reward policy and is attributed to Delton Chen via the phrase "Chen's papers".

== Policy overview ==
=== Policy type ===
The carbon reward is a market-based climate policy for establishing an international mitigation market with a price floor that is guaranteed by central banks. An alternative name for this policy is mitigate and trade. This alternative name derives from the fact that the policy (a) rewards GHG mitigation with XCR, and (b) invites voluntary XCR trading and investing as a means of distributing the mitigation cost. Investors would be attracted to the XCR because of its guaranteed price floor. Central banks would be the 'buyers of last resort' to ensure that the value of the XCR remains above the price floor. A potential benefit of the approach is that it could span the multi-trillion-dollar climate finance gap that is currently impeding the main goals of the 2015 Paris Agreement.

The term carbon reward distinguishes the policy from other market policies, such as carbon taxes, cap and trade, and subsidies, and it also distinguishes the instrument from carbon credits and carbon offsets. The carbon reward is a performance-based grant and a type of results-based climate financing (RBCF). According to the World Bank, RBCF is "...a well-established financing modality in the health and education sectors but it is still in an early stage of deployment in the area of climate change".

The carbon reward is considered by Delton Chen to be a necessary policy innovation for correcting a market-and-system failure in GHG emissions. Chen argues that the climate crisis is actually a market-and-system failure that is characterised by a new type of externality, called a systemic externality, which he claims is overlooked in standard (neoclassical) economic scholarship and explains the political gridlock over the main goals of the Paris Agreement.

=== Policy objectives ===
The primary objective of the carbon reward is to declare a GHG mitigation roadmap that aligns with the main goals of the Paris Agreement (to remain below +2.0 °C and to pursue +1.5 °C) and to adhere to this roadmap through voluntary collective action. Technically speaking, this objective is framed by the internalisation of the systemic externality that was introduced by Delton Chen. Chen views this internalisation process as complementary to the internalisation of the negative externality that is related to man-made GHG emissions. The systemic externality is attributed to the unfavourable dynamics of societal and earth systems that amplify the market failure and make it politically intractable when relying on standard policies. The negative externality, on the other hand, is driven by the self-interest of market actors who do not pay enough for their GHG emissions. The carbon reward should be combined with other policies to establish 'carrot and stick' carbon pricing so that the (new) systemic externality and the (traditional) negative externality are both internalised.

A secondary objective of the carbon reward is to maximise co-benefits and minimise the harms that would be generated by mitigation actions in the carbon reward market. Co-benefits are considered to include (a) community wellbeing, (b) ecosystem health, and (c) industrial reliability and may also be understood in terms of the UN's sustainable development goals.

=== Market Instrument ===
The policy instrument is called a carbon reward (XCR). The XCR is a novel market instrument because is a financial asset that would be carbon-linked, limited-risk, sovereign-backed, and tradable in the Forex.

==== Not a carbon credit or offset ====
The XCR is not a carbon credit and it cannot be used to offset GHG emissions. The carbon reward market is designed to reduce the world's reliance on carbon offsetting. The XCR does not convey the ownership of mitigated GHGs, and so any mitigated GHG that falls within the carbon reward market cannot be double-counted or traded as carbon credits.

==== Not a currency ====
The XCR is not a currency, because it does not function as a medium of exchange.

=== Carbon accounting ===
The supply of XCR would be indexed to the individual carbon accounts of the organisations that participate in the carbon reward market. The cumulative mass of mitigated GHG emissions would also be reported through official reports because this mass is not explicitly defined by the XCR supply. This is because the XCR is, by design, not fungible in relation to the mass of mitigated GHGs. The unit of account of the XCR is defined as 1/R tCO2e that is mitigated with a durability of 100 years or more, where R is the reward multiplier for each mitigation project. The R value for all CDR projects is equal to 1 to establish a level playing field and promote market efficiency. The R value for conventional mitigation projects would be adjusted to ensure that the reward finance is sufficient and cost-effective for achieving mitigation outcomes that reasonably align with the declared mitigation roadmap of the policy.

=== Institutional arrangements ===
==== Carbon Exchange Authority (CEA) ====
A supranational authority, called a Carbon Exchange Authority (CEA), is required to operationalise the carbon reward policy and manage the supply and demand sides of the XCR market. A key operational objective of the CEA is to mobilise trillions-of-dollars per year of climate finance through the following three reward channels:

- (Reward Channel 1) issuing XCR for carbon dioxide removal (CDR), also called negative emissions technologies,
- (Reward Channel 2) issuing XCR for conventional GHG mitigation, including emissions reductions and avoidance,
- (Reward Channel 3) redistributing XCR between mitigation projects for attracting more co-benefits and less harm.

Reward Channel 1 would establish a common global price for CDR, whereas Reward Channel 2 would provide flexible incentives (based on the reward multiplier, R) to ensure sufficient sectoral and global rates of conventional mitigation.

The XCR supply would increase whenever XCR is issued through Reward Channels 1 or 2. However, the XCR supply would not change when Reward Channel 3 is applied, and this is because Reward Channel 3 is used to redistribute XCR amongst mitigation projects based on their co-benefits and harms as perceived by stakeholders. Reward Channel 3 is a Robin Hood redistribution scheme roughly similar to a Robin Hood tax, but focused on co-benefits.

The CEA would coordinate a central bank alliance that is mandated to guarantee the XCR price floor. With this mandate for central banks, the carbon reward market would have the capacity to mobilise trillions-of-dollars of new climate finance each year without imposing direct costs on governments, firms, or citizens. The CEA would be a self-funded organisation because its administrative costs would be covered by fees and commissions on XCR issuance.

==== Central bank carbon-alliance ====
The XCR price floor would be guaranteed by a central bank carbon-alliance that implements carbon quantitative easing (CQE). Central banks may require specific new mandates to join the alliance. CQE is a proposed international monetary program that would provide central banks with instructions to purchase XCR in specific quantities to prevent the XCR spot price from falling below its floor. All participating central banks would be coordinated by CQE to ensure that policy-driven impacts on exchange rates and monetary inflation are benign and equitable. A monetary board would oversee the XCR price floor by liaising between the CEA and the central bank alliance.

=== Causal mechanisms ===
The effectiveness of the carbon reward policy will depend on a set of causal mechanisms including the interaction of carrot and stick incentives in terms of their emergent outcomes. The aim of the policy is to bypass political bottlenecks with scalable finance for triggering a major shift in market behaviour and the scaling-up of effective climate action.

The policy's causal mechanisms are social, informational, financial and political. They include (1) the provision of globally available performance-based rewards for mitigated GHGs, (2) the provision of a global database for mitigation opportunities and a carbon stocktake for the policy, (3) the channeling of the mitigation cost into the foreign exchange market via Coasean bargaining in XCR, and into the balance sheets of central banks via CQE, (4) the provision of individual contracts for each mitigation project for measurement, reporting, and verification purposes over the long-term, and (5) creating layers of 'carrot and stick' carbon pricing using a toolbox of policies with the aim of maximising cooperation.

=== Current status ===
The seminal ideas for the carbon reward policy are presented in several journal publications and the most contemporary version of the policy and economic justifications are presented in Chen's 2025 working paper. Despite these developments, the policy has yet to be officially considered by policy institutions or government officials.

== Financial mechanism ==
=== XCR Supply & Demand ===
The financial mechanism for the carbon reward market may be understood in terms of XCR price discovery based on XCR's supply and XCR's partially-managed demand. The supply function is the rate at which the XCR is created and issued when rewarding organisations that successfully mitigate GHGs under Reward Channels 1 and 2. The demand function is represented by the XCR price floor which will be guaranteed by an alliance of central banks. The advertised yield and limited-risk embodied in the XCR price floor will attract private investment in the XCR. This financial mechanism will not result in direct costs for governments, firms, or citizens because the cost will be channelled into the foreign exchange markets (i.e. with the crowding-out of other investments) and into central bank balance sheets. The policy-driven monetary inflation would be the primary concern of policymakers, and Chen's preliminary analysis suggests that this inflation would be moderate and manageable.

==== XCR supply function: conditional reward payments ====
The supply function for the XCR is based on assessing the mass of GHGs mitigated under contracts and relating these reward payments to XCR's unit of account (1/R tonnes of CO_{2}e with at least 100-year durability, where R is the reward multiplier). The reward rules would be developed and approved by the CEA to ensure that the reward market is cost-effective.

==== XCR demand function: guaranteed price floor ====
The demand function for the XCR is based on the guaranteed XCR price floor, with the guarantee being enforced by the central bank alliance using CQE. This guarantee would be used to build trust in the carbon reward market and to encourage market participants to make high CapEx investments.

The ideal price floor is defined by the marginal cost of CDR that is sufficient to achieve the declared mitigation roadmap for the policy. This ideal price floor is termed the risk cost of carbon (RCC). The XCR price floor would have two key parts: a period of guaranteed prices over ~10 years, followed by forward guidance over another ~90 years, with the price floor rolling forward in time so that it always provides long-term price guidance.

The policy's price signal would be composed of

- historical XCR spot prices, and
- the XCR price floor that spans 100 years and rolls forward.

Spot prices should never fall below the floor with the central bank guarantee. The price floor will incentivise markets to mitigate GHG emissions, scale-up CDR projects, invest in clean technologies, and invest in the XCR asset. Private demand for XCR will be strongest when the price floor is rising and outpaces inflation (refer the consumer price index) and will be the weakest when the price floor does not keep pace with inflation or falls in value.

== Economic theory ==
=== Social principles ===
Common But Differentiated Responsibilities (CBDR) is the guiding principle of the UNFCCC. The CBDR principle was formalised at the Earth Summit in Rio de Janeiro, 1992. CBDR acknowledges that all states have a shared obligation to address environmental destruction, and that countries that have produced the most greenhouse gases should contribute proportionally more to climate change mitigation.

The polluter pays principle is a social principle that supports the carbon tax and similar punitive policies. This principle has limitations when carbon taxes and other punitive policies fail to attract political cooperation. Delton Chen and his colleagues proposed a social principle, called the preventive insurance principle, for supporting the carbon reward approach. Chen defines the preventive insurance principle as:

"...a social principle and legal assertion that governments, central banks, and financial regulators be required to (a) acknowledge that systemic risks to the carbon cycle are caused by societal systems and earth systems, and (b) accept responsibility for managing these systemic risks through appropriate policies, laws, mandates, alliances, remits, and programs."

The preventative insurance principle acknowledges that scalable mitigation should be a priority given that future climate change could be extreme and irreversible.

=== Dual-externality thesis ===
Delton Chen, Joël van der Beek and Jonathan Cloud articulated a seminal theory, called the Holistic Market Hypothesis (HMH), which proposed that the standard economic theory is incomplete because systemic risks linked to the anthropogenic carbon balance are not addressed by Arthur Cecil Pigou's welfare theory. The HMH considers the systemic risk problem to be a type of positive externality, with reference to Pigou's framework.

Delton Chen superseded the HMH with his dual-externality thesis. This thesis replaces the positive externality with a new type of externality, called a systemic externality. Chen's dual-externality thesis attributes the climate crisis to two externalities: (1) the traditional negative externality, caused by unpriced GHG emissions and quantified as the social cost of carbon (SCC), and (2) the new systemic externality, caused by unpriced systemic risks to the carbon cycle and quantified as the risk cost of carbon (RCC). The SCC is used by economists to define the ideal carbon tax under cost-benefit analysis, while the RCC—according to the dual-externality thesis—is used to define the ideal carbon reward under cost-effectiveness analysis. The dual-externality thesis claims that correcting the market failure will require a trade-off with some social efficiency being sacrificed in favour of achieving systemic safety.

==== Matrix classification of market outcomes ====
Chen developed a matrix classification system for market outcomes based on a 2x2 matrix. The matrix organises complex systems into four emergent but distinct outcome classes based on two key attributes. These two attributes are sub-divided into binary options or into two ordinal value ranges. This matrix classification system was used by Chen to categorise climate damages, systemic risks, and market policies to provide a multifaceted understanding of the market failure. By comparison, standard economics provides a much simpler conceptual model for the market failure in GHG emissions.

When applied to GHGs, the matrix sorts damages by value (material vs. moral) and domain (social vs. environmental), producing four classes from tangible welfare losses to intangible moral or environmental damage. For systemic risks, attributes of spatial scale (global vs. local) and system type (societal vs. earth systems) produce a structured understanding of market vulnerabilities, from finance gaps to ecological instability.

Market policies and their objectives are similarly classified, distinguishing between pricing based on positive prices (carrots) or negative prices (sticks), and instruments based on either national fiat or carbon-linked units. The policy matrix for carbon identifies four major market policy types, including taxes, cap and trade, subsidies and carbon rewards.

Joining these three matrices creates an expanded economic framework, clarifying the complexity of the market failure in GHG emissions and supporting a toolkit of market policies for layered carrot and stick carbon pricing with scope to address various geopolitical scales, from local to global.

=== Limitation of social time discounting ===
The estimation of the SCC has attracted considerable attention from economists and it is often controversial because of the sensitivity of the SCC to the social discount rate (SDR). A relatively high SDR will result in a lower carbon tax, short-term planning, and less regard for future generations. The narrative surrounding the SDR is often split between two sides, with one side favouring a descriptive SDR and a relatively low carbon tax, and the other side favouring an ethical (i.e. prescriptive) SDR and a relatively high carbon tax. The dual-externality thesis offers a resolution to this problem by introducing the carbon reward policy with the objective of internalising the RCC into the economy (i.e. to manage the systemic risks to the carbon cycle). The RCC is framed by a rolling 100-year planning horizon. For this reason the RCC is determined independently of marginal social welfare and the SDR—and is not affected by time discounting.

The Tragedy of the Horizon paradoxes are anecdotes presented by Mark Carney in reference to the short planning horizon of central banks in relation to risk management. They also refer to the more general problem that the current generation is weakly incentivised to fix the climate problem for future generations. Chen infers that a rising price floor for the carbon reward (XCR)—determined from the RCC—will produce a secular bull market in the XCR for resolving these paradoxes. In other words, Chen's solution is to "...convert tomorrow's risk into today's profits". It appears that carbon reward would induce a negative feedback on global warming because it would be a limited-risk financial asset that is pro-cyclical with a growing systemic risk.

== Plausibility of net-zero carbon ==
Chen and his co-authors propose that the carbon reward (previously called a carbon currency) can be used to create a roadmap to net-zero carbon emissions. They propose that the world economy can be reconfigured as a dual-market system, comprising

- existing markets that use national fiat currencies to price goods and services, and
- a global GHG mitigation market that receives carbon rewards (XCR) as conditional grants.

This dual-market conceptual model was later expanded by Chen to include three collective markets, namely

- a market for GHG emitting industries that behave as heat engines,
- a market for CO_{2} absorbing industries that behave as negentropy engines, and
- a market for electrified industries that behave as carbon-neutral engines.

With regards to the dual-market model, existing markets are associated with national currencies, whereas the new carbon reward market would be associated with the XCR instrument. The XCR instrument would not act as a medium-of-exchange but instead would only function as a price signal and store-of-value. According to Chen et al., the global annual mitigation rate, $\bigtriangleup\! Q$, that would earn the carbon reward can be sub-divided into: (1) a portion that is economically coupled to existing markets, $(1-\omega) \bigtriangleup\! Q$; and (2) a portion that would be economically decoupled from existing markets, $\omega \bigtriangleup\! Q$. The mitigation rate, $\omega \bigtriangleup\! Q$, would thus depend on the economic value of the carbon reward given that this reward would be the primary source of funding for carbon dioxide removal (CDR).

=== Modified Kaya identity ===
The original Kaya identity relates global CO_{2} emissions to various factors, including gross world product, denoted as G. If the carbon reward is globally implemented, then the carbon reward (XCR) should be available to earn and trade in every country, however the XCR would not be legal tender. Subsequently, the purchase of goods and services with the XCR will not be allowed, and the XCR would not factor in the estimation of gross domestic product (GDP) or G. However, the XCR would influence G because the XCR would be used to increase the marginal value of the goods and services that have utility for reducing CO_{2} emissions or removing CO_{2} from the atmosphere.

Chen et al. propose that the total mass of anthropogenic CO_{2} that is emitted to the atmosphere can be described using a modified version of the Kaya identity, shown below. In this modified Kaya identity, a portion of mitigated CO_{2} that is decoupled from the economy, denoted $\omega \bigtriangleup\! Q$, is subtracted from the original Kaya identity:

$F = P \cdot \frac{G}{P} \cdot \frac{E}{G} \cdot \frac{F}{E}-\omega \bigtriangleup\! Q$

Where:

- F is global CO_{2} emissions from human sources
- P is global population
- G is world GDP
- E is global energy consumption
- $\omega$ is the economic decoupling factor
- $\bigtriangleup$Q is the global mitigated CO_{2} that is rewarded with carbon rewards (previously called carbon currency)

And:

- G/P is the GDP per capita
- E/G is the energy intensity of the GDP
- F/E is the carbon footprint of energy
- $\omega \bigtriangleup$Q is the economically-decoupled carbon dioxide removal (CDR)

Chen and his co-authors propose that $\omega \bigtriangleup\! Q$ will be significant but mostly unrelated to traditional economic activity. Certain negative emissions technologies (NETs) can be powered directly by the sun or by other renewable energy sources, such that a portion of the total CDR can be self-reliant in terms of energy inputs.

With reference to the above formula, the carbon reward could be used to reduce F in absolute terms by incentivising the following:

- ethical reductions in global population, P, relative to a baseline
- reductions in the average carbon intensity of goods and services, F/G, relative to a baseline
- reductions in the average carbon intensity of energy supplied, F/E, relative to a baseline
- increases in global CDR and its planned decoupling from the mainstream economy, $\omega \bigtriangleup$Q.

The above four activities may be undertaken to increase absolute reductions in F until net-zero carbon (i.e. F = 0) is achieved. Chen et al. name this economic growth pattern as optimal growth but later Chen renames it carbon-balanced agnostic-growth (carbon-balanced a-growth). An economic model of carbon-balanced a-growth would need to take into account the market's response to the XCR price floor, including any institutional and household investment in XCR, noting that households that invest in the XCR might also increase their total savings rate and reduce consumption.

A carbon reward market would not aim to reduce G or E as a strategy. The carbon reward market would treat G and E as a dependent variables, given that economic decarbonisation will influence G and E. Observed changes in the quantity and the quality of G and E would be used in a feedback loop in the design of the reward rules and management of the XCR price floor.

If reducing G or E in absolute terms were to be adopted as an explicit objective, then this would constitute a different policy approach, often called economic degrowth. According to a quantitative assessment by Keyßer and Lenzen, degrowth scenarios appear less risky than technology-driven pathways that support more consumption and economic growth. Economic degrowth and solar geoengineering are additional mitigation strategies that could be considered if the carbon reward and conventional policies were insufficient for achieving the desired climate objective. The carbon reward policy does not financially reward economic degrowth or solar geoengineering, and as such implementing these strategies would require other policies.
