= David Woo =

American economist

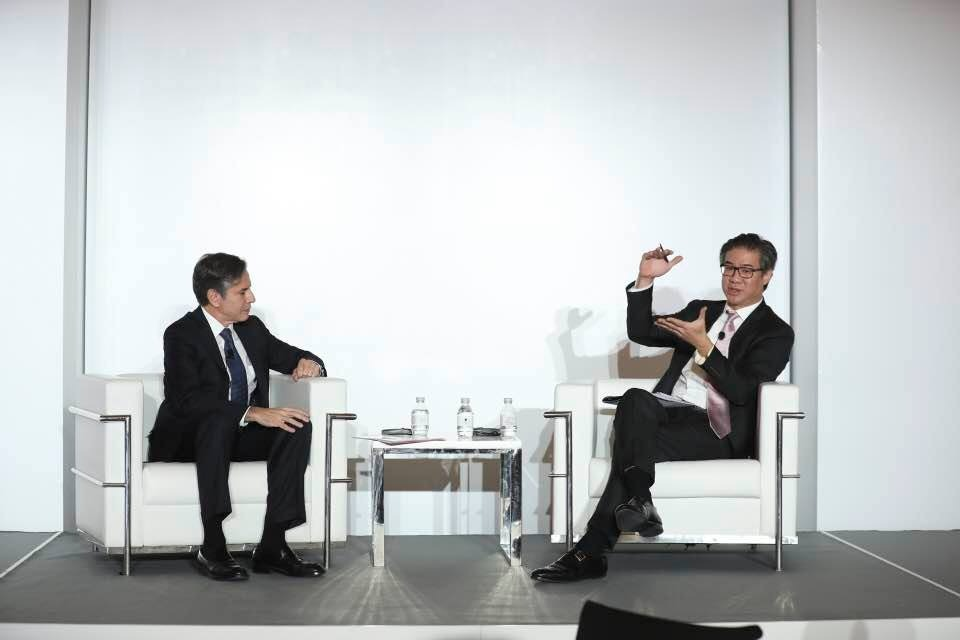
- Born: Pittsburgh, Pennsylvania
- Education: Columbia University; Tufts University
- Occupations: Economist, investment strategist
- Years active: July 2021–present
- Spouse: Margalit Shinar

David Woo is an American economist and an investment strategist with a focus on the intersections between economics, politics, geopolitics and financial markets. Bloomberg calls him as one of the most outspoken voices on Wall Street. In 2026, he co-authored a novel, Merry-Go-Round Broke Down: A Novel of Guilt, Greed & Globalization, with his wife, which became a USA Today bestseller.

== Early life and education ==
Woo was born in Pittsburgh, Pennsylvania to Chinese parents who had fled mainland China to Taiwan, where he was raised. He attended the Northfield Mount Hermon School in Massachusetts.

Woo received a B.S. in mathematics from Tufts University in 1990 and a Ph.D. in economics from Columbia University in 1996.

== Career ==
Woo began his career as an economist at the International Monetary Fund in 1996, where he researched the causes of financial crises and their remedies. He also worked on the IMF programs for South Korea (1997) and Russia (1998).

In 2000, he joined Citigroup in London as head of local markets strategy for Central and Eastern Europe, the Middle East, and Africa. From 2004 to 2010, Woo was the head of global foreign exchange strategy at Barclays Capital in London.

In 2010, Woo joined Bank of America Merrill Lynch in New York as the Head of Global Rates and Foreign Exchange Research. A year later, he also took over Emerging Markets Fixed Income & Economics Research. In this role, he led a group of 50 analysts responsible for the bank’s forecasts for global bond yields and exchange rates for over 100 countries. Woo was a member of the bank’s Research Executive Management Committee.

In 2021, Woo left Bank of America to launch David Woo Unbound, a global macro advisory, and the David Woo Unbound YouTube channel to share his insights on key developments in economics, politics, geopolitics, and technology.

Woo is a lecturer at Reichman University in Israel. He teaches investment strategy in the MA program in financial economics and serves on the board of the program.

== Research ==
Woo's research has focused on the intersection of economics, politics, and financial markets.

In a July 2012 cost-benefit analysis of Eurozone membership, David Woo and Athanasios Vamvakidis concluded that Italy and Ireland had the greatest incentive to exit the monetary union and that a weaker euro was necessary to reduce this incentive.

In March 2013, Woo argued that increased U.S. oil and gas production would strengthen the United States dollar by reducing the current account deficit and boosting investment.

Also, in 2013, he authored a research report on Bitcoin, in which he estimated a long-term value of approximately $1,300 per coin. Woo was the first major Wall Street analyst to initiate Bitcoin coverage.

Woo's economic forecasts included a 2015 prediction that China would devalue the renminbi, which occurred in August of that year.

In September 2016, Woo forecast that Donald Trump would win the U.S. presidential election and that a victory would result in higher U.S. Treasury yields and a stronger dollar, predictions that were correct. Prior to the 2020 U.S. election, he predicted the results would be closer than consensus forecasts suggested. Twelve days before the 2024 US elections, Woo said in a Bloomberg Television interview that there was a 75% chance of a Trump victory.

== Personal life ==
Woo is married to Margalit Shinar. The couple reside in a Jerusalem-foothills home designed by Israeli architect Kedem Shinar. The Wallpaper magazine describes the house as a fusion between Japanese design and modern aesthetic. In 2026, Woo wrote an essay on his relationship with Shinar and their 20-year age gap, published in The New York Times' "Modern Love" column.

== Recognition ==
In 2013, Business Insider included Woo on its list of "Wall Street's 12 Smartest People". Institutional Investor magazine frequently gave high rankings to Woo and his teams. In 2019, his Bank of America team was rated #1 in the publication's survey of fixed-income and currency research. In 2020, his group received more first-place positions in the Institutional Investor Global Fixed-Income survey than any other bank's team.
