= Soft landing (disambiguation) =

A soft landing is an aircraft landing which does not result in the destruction of the payload and/or the vehicle.

Soft landing may also refer to:

- Soft landing (economics), a business cycle downturn which avoids recession
- Soft Landing (Snelson), sculpture by Kenneth Snelson in Denver, Colorado, USA
- Soft Landing (band), a spinoff band of the band Beirut
- Soft Landing (novel), a 1995 novel by Alexander Gromov
- "Soft Landing" (film), an animated short in the 1981 compilation animated film Heavy Metal
- Softlanding Linux System, an early Linux distribution

== See also ==
- Hard landing (disambiguation)
- Landing (disambiguation)
