= National debt of Japan =

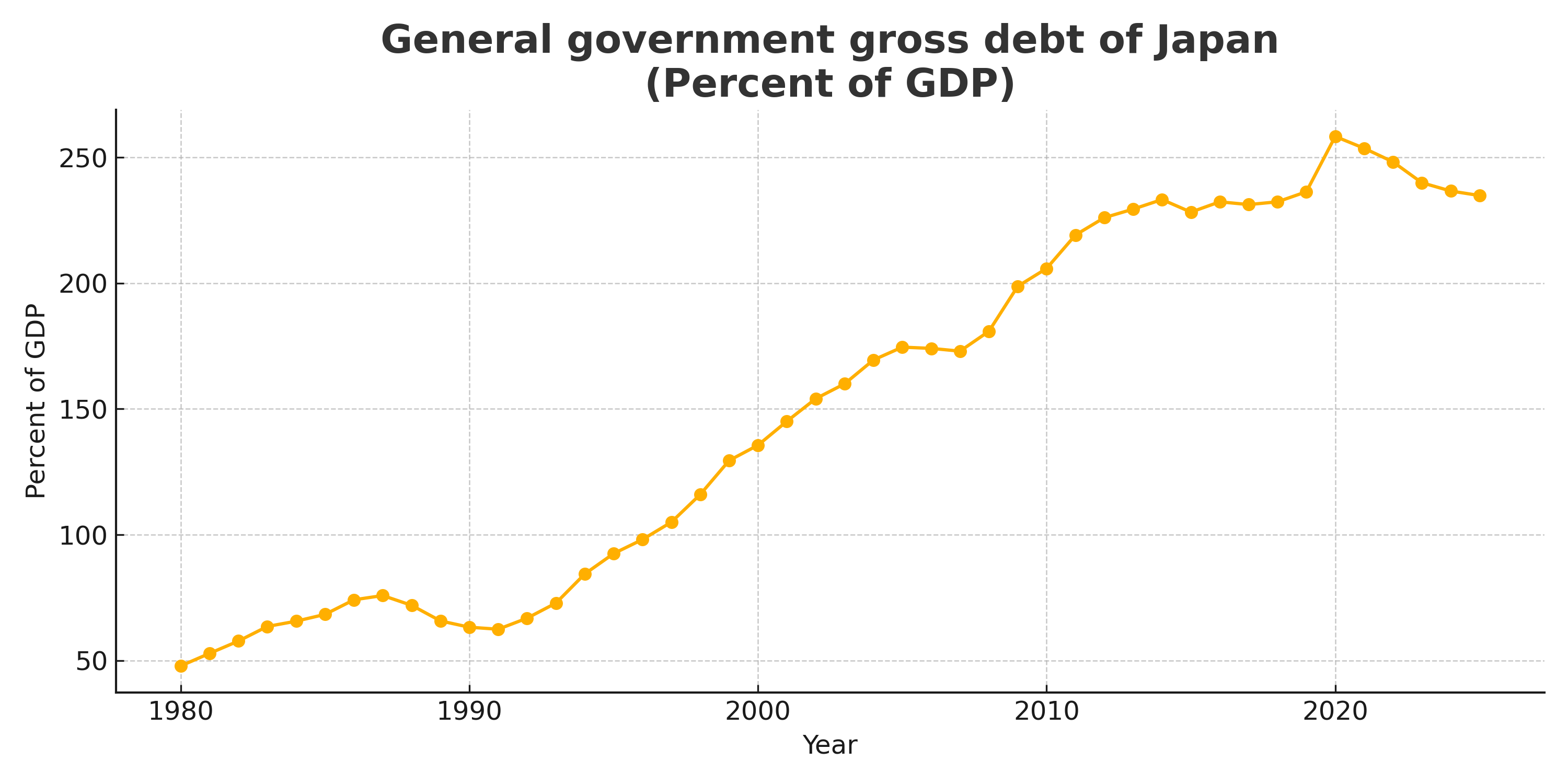
Japan national debt to GDP

The national debt of Japan is the total quantity of money borrowed by the Government of Japan through the issuance of government bonds by the Ministry of Finance and other government agencies.

At the end of March 2025, the general gross debt of the Japanese Government was 1,324 trillion yen, or 234.9% of the country's gross domestic product, and is one of the highest among developed nations. At the end of December 2024, of the total government debt balance of 1,212 trillion yen, 88.1 per cent was held domestically. The largest holders were the Bank of Japan (46.3 per cent), domestic insurance companies (15.6 per cent), and domestic banks (14.5 per cent).

Japan's asset price bubble collapse in 1991 led to a prolonged period of economic stagnation described as the 'Lost Decades', with GDP falling significantly in nominal terms through the 1990s. In response, the Bank of Japan set out in the early 2000s to encourage economic growth through the non-traditional policy of quantitative easing. By 2013, Japanese public debt exceeded one quadrillion yen (approximately US$10.46 trillion at the time). This was roughly twice the country's annual gross domestic product, and already the largest debt ratio of any nation.

== History ==
During the World War II, Japanese Central bank was dominated by the government and gradually lost its independence. By November 1932, Japanese Central bank had become the main buyer of government sovereign bond, and adopted an unconditional purchase policy.

With the outbreak of Sino-Japanese war in 1937, the Japanese government implemented a wartime financial strategy. The government enacted the National Mobilization Law in 1938 and the Bank Fund Management Order of October 1940, completely placing all financing activities under government control. To absorb private savings from Japanese household, the government also established the National Savings Promotion Bureau in 1943. Only for the purchase of government bond, can Japanese people withdraw money from this fund.

Therefore, in 1944, when the Pacific War was about to come to its end, the amount of Japan's governmental debt stood at more than 260% of its national income.

In 1947 during the post-war economic chaos, the number of bonds that the government issued exceeded tax revenue. Later, it was thought that this was the root cause of postwar inflation, and Japanese government enacted the Public Finance Act of Japan in response. The act established a balanced fiscal policy by prohibiting: 1) the issuance of government bonds to cover national debt, and, 2) the Bank of Japan from buying government bonds. However, its proviso made it possible for the central government to issue public debt for the purpose of "public work expenditure", collecting revenue in exceptional circumstances. The amount for the public debt should not exceed what was approved by the Diet resolution.

The government was very conservative in defining the "public works expenditure" in the beginning, referring that to recoverable investment. In the time period 1945 to 1964, Japanese government had a balanced budget.

Since the establishment of the 1955 System, the amount of held valuable securities in the bank – especially national bonds – had risen significantly. However, Japanese economy encountered serious structural recession in 1965 and in order to stimulate the economy, the 1965 budget under Sato Cabinet issued 259 billion yen in deficit-covering bonds. This was the first time to issue government bonds since WWII and under the clause of construction bond for the purpose of "public work expenditure". The next year's budget in 1966 allotted 730 billion yen in construction bonds. By 1990, the government did not issue a national bond due to the Japanese asset price bubble. Bonds were issued again in 1994, and have been issued every year since.

In 1995 (Heisei 9), Masayoshi Takemura, the Japanese finance minister at the time, declared Fiscal Crisis by issuing deficit-covering bonds with higher frequency.

=== Addressing public debt ===
In August 2011, Moody's rating cut Japan's long-term sovereign debt rating by one notch to Aa3 from Aa2 in line with the size of the country's deficit and borrowing level. contributing factors were large budget deficits and government debt since the global recession of 2008 and the "triple disaster" of an earthquake, a tsunami and a nuclear reactor meltdown in 2011. In 2012, the Organisation for Economic Co-operation and Development (OECD) Yearbook editorial stated that Japan's "debt rose above 200% of GDP partly as a consequence of triple disaster and the related reconstruction efforts." Former Prime Minister Naoto Kan called the situation "urgent" due to the ballooning debt.

In order to address the Japanese budget gap and growing national debt, the Japanese National Diet, at the urging of Prime Minister Yoshihiko Noda of the Democratic Party of Japan (DPJ), passed a bill in June 2012 to double the national consumption tax to 10%. This increased the tax to 8% in April 2014. The originally scheduled 10% tax increase to be implemented in October 2015 was delayed until at least October 2019. The final increase to 10% was implemented on October 1, 2019. The goal of this increase was to halt the growth of the public debt by 2015, although reducing the debt would require further measures. The DPJ subsequently lost control of the Diet in late 2012, and Noda's successor Shinzo Abe of the Liberal Democratic Party implemented the "Abenomics" program, which involved an additional 10.3 trillion yen of economic stimulus spending to balance out the negative impact of the consumption tax increase on economic growth.

Abenomics led to rapid appreciation in the Japanese stock market in early 2013 without significantly impacting Japanese government bond yields, although 10-year forward rates rose slightly. Around 70% of Japanese government bonds are purchased by the Bank of Japan, and much of the remainder is purchased by Japanese banks and trust funds, which largely insulates the prices and yields of such bonds from the effects of the global bond market and reduces their sensitivity to credit rating changes. Betting against Japanese government bonds has become known as the "widowmaker trade" due to their price resilience even if fundamental analysis indicates the contrary should be true.

The servicing of the national debt cost 22% of the Japanese national budget as of 2023. The cost of importing energy in the wake of Fukushima disaster in 2011 has also negatively impacted Japan's longstanding current account surplus.

== National bond issuing and economic policy ==
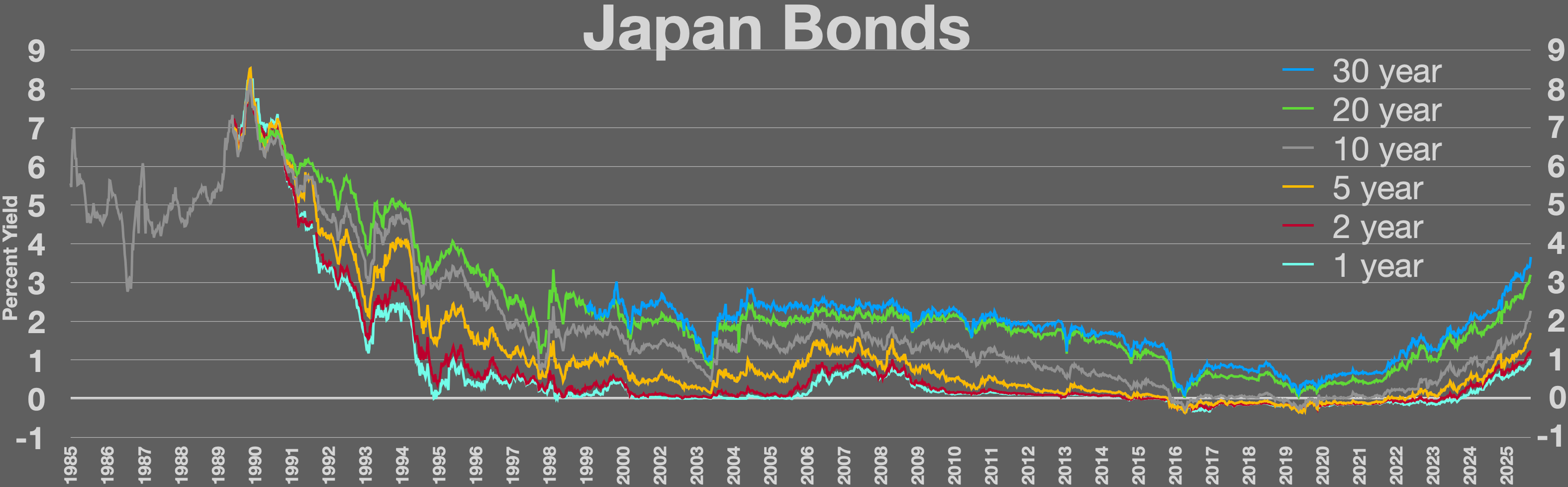
Japan bonds Inverted yield curve in 1990 Zero interest-rate policy started in 1999 Negative interest policy started in 2016 30 year 20 year 10 year 5 year 2 year 1 year

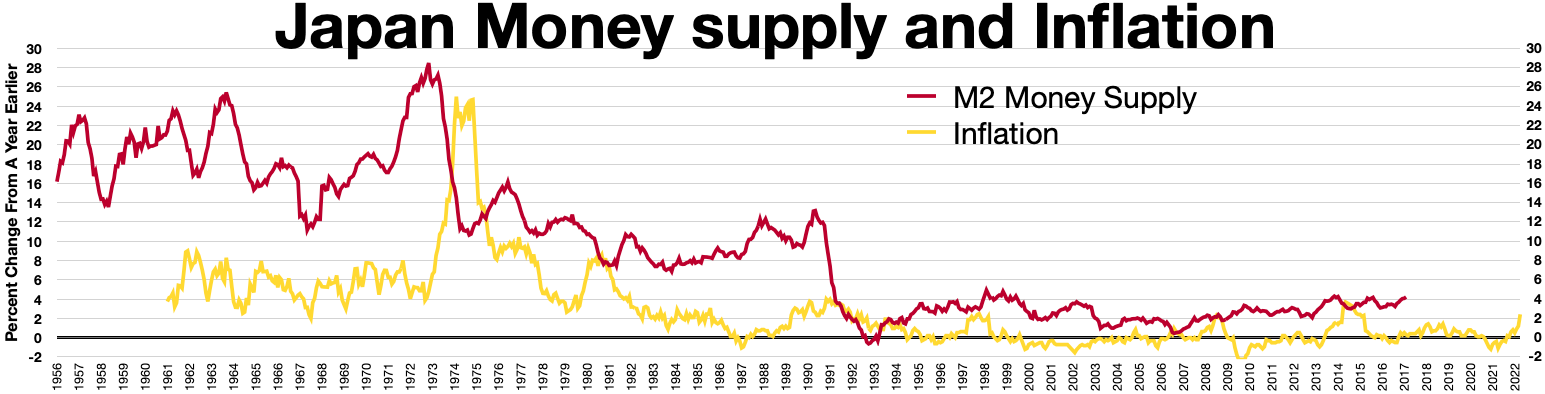
Japan money supply and inflation (year over year) M2 money supply Inflation

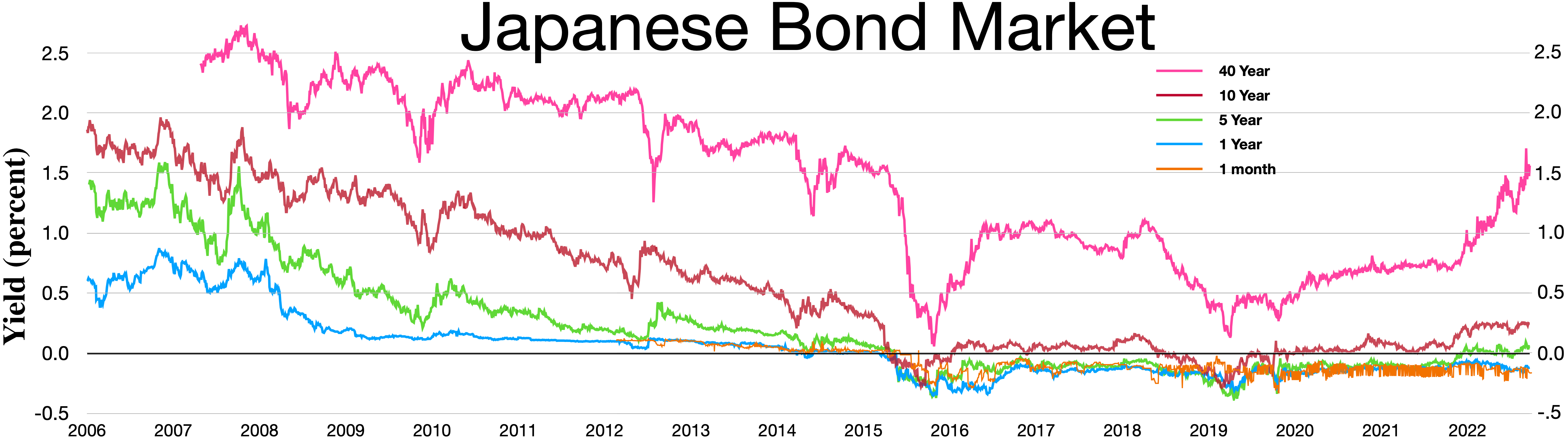
Japanese Bond Market Negative interest rates started in 2014. 40 year bond 10 year bond 5 year bond 1 year bond 1 month bond

During the Japanese asset price bubble of the late 1980s, revenues were high due to prosperous conditions, Japanese stocks profited, and the amount of national bonds issued was modest. With the breakdown of the economic bubble came a decrease in annual revenue. As a result, the amount of national bonds issued increased quickly. Most of the national bonds had a fixed interest rate, so the debt to GDP ratio increased as a consequence of the decrease in nominal GDP growth due to deflation.

The growth of annual revenue was slowed down by the prolonged depression. Consequently, the governments started issuing additional national bonds to cover the interest payments. This national bond is called renewal national bond. As a result of issuing these bonds, the debt is not actually repaid, and the amount of bonds issued continued to grow. Japan has continued to issue bonds to cover the debt since the asset price bubble collapse.

There was the phase that opportunity to act austerity policy rose when the fear for return (repayment) principal of interest was close-upped at any trouble happened. But, the policy was acted, that was the inadequate fiscal action by the government and bring finance under control by the Bank of Japan, when critical recession caused by austerity policy and others. There was the opinion that suggested a fear for general situation of the economic structure, that the Japanese economy experienced deflation caused by globalization and the growing international competition. These factors steered the direction of Japanese economic policy, hence, the perceived harmful impact to the economic strength of the country.

With the above-mentioned view point from the mobilizing of finances by the government or the action to monetary squeeze by the BOJ, or, from the view point that it has been deflation recession caused by long termed low demand, there are criticisms that it also cause an effect hurt power of economy the tend to promote structural reform increase efficiency of supply side. On the other hand, there are following suggestions for that criticisms:

- Paul Krugman suggested that the opportunity cost of investment has been greater than the ROI, and that the quantitative easing policy has not been effective. He said that printing notes will not work if the country is in a liquidity trap.
- Yasushi Iwamoto, an economist suggested that the issue of decline in the economic growth rate has been beyond the ability of monetary policy.
- Takatoshi Ito and Motoshige Ito, both economist suggested necessity of structural reform to recover from the adverse effect of a monetary policy.

=== Direct purchase of government bonds by Bank of Japan ===
A policy was planned and enacted in which the national central bank would directly buy the national bonds.

Economist Kazuhito Ikeo stated, "Quantitative easing and debt monetization are different from each other. We must not assume they are the same just because both involve the Bank of Japan buying government bonds. 'Lending money' is clearly different from 'giving money', but we just see the money move from one place to another, and they look exactly the same in that aspect."

==== The Public Finance Act ====
The Public Finance Act prohibits the Bank of Japan from buying government bonds directly. Nevertheless, according to the provision, it is allowed to buy when the National Diet approves the bill. These regulations result from realization that the Bank of Japan brought about violent inflation by their public bond purchases during the period from before to just after the Pacific War.

== See also ==
- List of countries by government debt
- Monetary and fiscal policy of Japan
- Net international investment position
