= Quantitative tightening =

Monetary policy tool of central banks

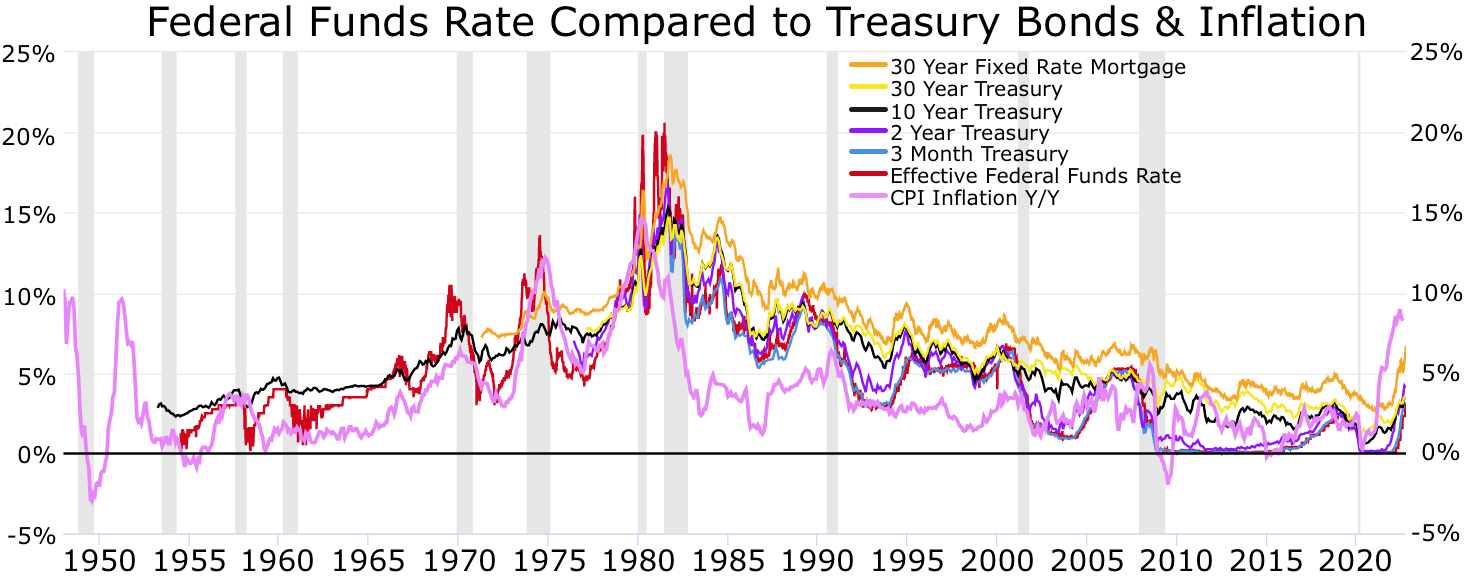
30 year mortgage average 30 Year Treasury Bond 10 Year Treasury Bond 2 Year Treasury Bond 3 month Treasury Bond Effective Federal Funds Rate CPI inflation year/year Recessions

Quantitative tightening (QT) is a contractionary monetary policy tool applied by central banks to decrease the amount of liquidity or money supply in the economy. A central bank implements quantitative tightening by reducing the financial assets it holds on its balance sheet by selling them into the financial markets, which decreases asset prices and raises interest rates. QT is the reverse of quantitative easing (or QE), where the central bank prints money and uses it to buy assets in order to raise asset prices and stimulate the economy. QT is rarely used by central banks, and has only been employed after prolonged periods of Greenspan put-type stimulus, where the creation of too much central banking liquidity has led to a risk of uncontrolled inflation (e.g. 2008, 2018 and 2022).

== Background ==
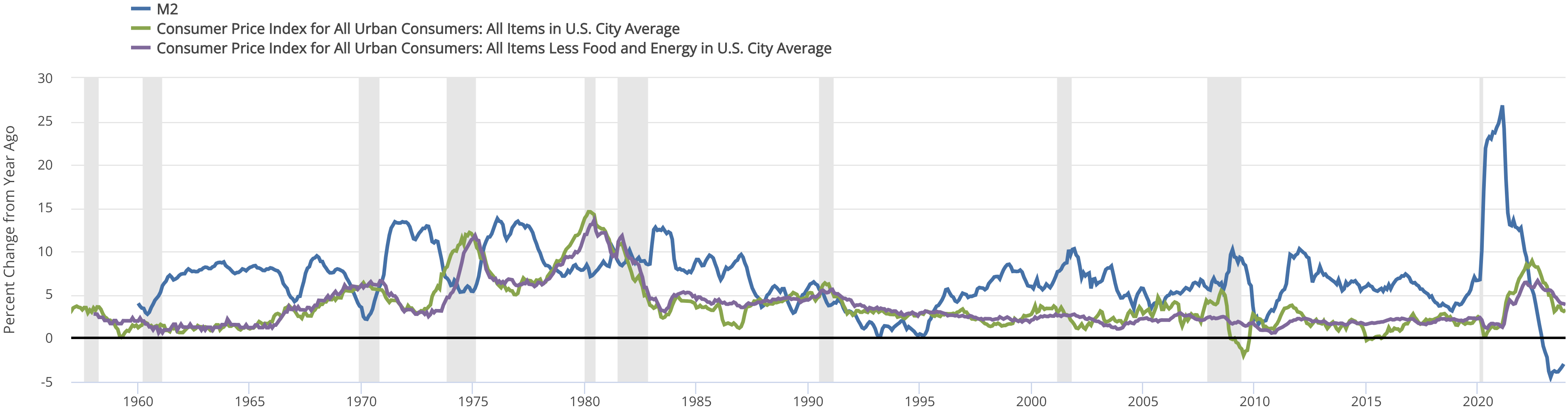
(Percent change from a year earlier) M2 money supply CPI Core CPI

Quantitative easing was massively applied by leading central banks to counter the Great Recession that started in 2008. The prime rates were decreased to zero; some rates later went into the negative territory. For example, to fight with ultra-low inflation or deflation caused by the economic crisis, the European Central Bank, overseeing monetary policy for countries that use the euro, introduced negative rates in 2014. The central banks of Japan, Denmark, Sweden, and Switzerland also set negative rates.

The main goal of QT is to normalize (i.e. raise) interest rates in order to avoid increasing inflation, by increasing the cost of accessing money and reducing demand for goods and services in the economy. Like QE before it, QT has never been done before on a massive scale, and its consequences have yet to materialize and be studied. In 2018, the Federal Reserve began retiring some of the debt on its balance sheet, beginning quantitative tightening. In 2019, less than a year after initiating QT, central banks, including the Federal Reserve, ended quantitative tightening due to negative market conditions occurring soon after.

In December 2021, there were reports that Jerome Powell, chair of the Federal Reserve, was under pressure to slow down QE and mortgage-backed security (MBS) purchases. This was due to severe inflation, with the CPI reading in November 2021 reaching a record-breaking 6.8% according to the Bureau of Labor Statistics, the highest level in 40 years. Bloomberg News called Powell "Wall Street's Head of State", as a reflection of how dominant Powell's actions were on asset prices and how profitable his actions were for Wall Street.

In June 2022, the Federal Reserve reintroduced QT to counter historically-high inflation as a result of the COVID-19 pandemic. This entailed the Federal Reserve passively shrinking its balance sheet by letting maturing securities "roll off" and not reinvesting the gains into the economy. As of September 2024, the Federal Reserve is continuing QT, allowing up to $50 billion in maturing Treasurys and mortgage-backed securities to roll off each month, down from the initial $95 billion when QT started.

=== European Central Bank policies ===
In 2023, the European Central Bank (ECB) accelerated its quantitative tightening process by deciding to stop renewing maturing government bonds, except for those included in the Pandemic Emergency Purchase Programme (PEPP), which will be reinvested until 2024. This change increased the value of non-renewed bonds to over €30 billion per month. The ECB's actions are part of a broader strategy to reduce inflation and normalize interest rates in the eurozone after a prolonged period of quantitative easing.

== Effect on asset prices ==
Whereas QE caused the substantial rise in asset prices over the past decade, QT may cause broadly offsetting effects in the opposite direction. To mitigate the financial market impact of the COVID-19 pandemic, Powell accepted asset price inflation as a consequence of Fed policy actions. Powell was criticized for using high levels of direct and indirect quantitative easing as valuations hit levels last seen at the peaks of previous bubbles.

== See also ==
- Consumer price index
- Excess reserves
- Greenspan put
- Inflation hedge
- Inverted yield curve
- Negative interest on excess reserves
- Zero interest-rate policy (ZIRP)
