= ZLB =

ZLB may refer to:

- Berlin Central and Regional Library (Zentral- und Landesbibliothek Berlin), the official library of the City and State of Berlin, Germany
- Zero lower bound, a macroeconomic problem that occurs when the short-term nominal interest rate is at or near zero
