= JGB =

JGB may refer to:

- J. G. Ballard, British science fiction writer
- Jerry Garcia Band, a band led by Grateful Dead co-founder Jerry Garcia
  - JGB (band), a band led by former Jerry Garcia Band keyboardist Melvin Seals that continues the musical tradition of the Jerry Garcia band
- Jagdalpur Airport, which has an IATA airport code of JGB
- Japanese government bond, see National debt of Japan
