= Zero lower bound =

Problem in macroeconomics

The zero lower bound (ZLB) or zero nominal lower bound (ZNLB) is a macroeconomic problem that occurs when the short-term nominal interest rate is at or near zero, causing a liquidity trap and limiting the central bank's capacity for inflation targeting.

The root cause of the ZLB is the issuance of paper currency by central banks, effectively guaranteeing a zero nominal interest rate and acting as an interest rate floor. Central banks cannot encourage spending by lowering interest rates, because people would simply hold cash instead. However, several central banks were able to reduce interest rates below zero; for example, the Czech National Bank estimates that the lower limit on its interest rate is below −1%.

The problem of the ZLB returned to prominence with Japan's experience during the 1990s, and more recently with the subprime crisis. The belief that monetary policy under the ZLB was effective in promoting economy growth has been critiqued by Paul Krugman, Gauti Eggertsson, and Michael Woodford among others.

== Alternatives ==
Milton Friedman, on the other hand, argued that a zero nominal interest rate presents no problem for monetary policy. According to Friedman, a central bank can increase the monetary base even if the interest rate vanishes; it only needs to continue buying bonds. Friedman also coined the term "helicopter drops" to illustrate how central banks could always generate spending and inflation. Friedman used the example of a helicopter flying over a town dropping dollar bills from the sky, which households then gathered in perfectly equal shares. Economists have argued that real-world versions of this idea would work at the zero lower bound. Typically, helicopter drops have been interpreted as involving the central bank directly financing the budget deficit.

The economist Willem Buiter has argued that helicopter money can always raise demand and inflation. Following the repeated struggles of the European Central Bank to revive the Eurozone economy and meet its inflation objective, a number of economists have taken a more literal interpretation of Friedman's parable and suggested that the European Central Bank should transfer cash directly to households.

Miles Kimball suggested that a modern economy either fully relying on digital currency or defining electronic money as the unit of account could eliminate the ZLB.

== See also ==
- Helicopter money
- Negative interest on excess reserves
- Negative interest rate
- Zero interest-rate policy
- Secular stagnation
- Shadow rate, which can be used to model interest rates near the zero lower bound
- Yield curve control
