= Excess reserves =

Monies held by bank in excess of reserve requirement

Excess reserves are bank reserves held by a bank in excess of a reserve requirement for it set by a central bank.

In the United States, bank reserves for a commercial bank are represented by its cash holdings and any credit balance in an account at its Federal Reserve Bank (FRB). Holding excess reserves long term may have an opportunity cost if higher risk-adjusted interest can be earned by putting the funds elsewhere.

For banks in the U.S. Federal Reserve System, excess reserves may be created by a given bank in the very short term by making short-term (usually overnight) loans on the federal funds market to another bank that may be short of its reserve requirements. Banks may also choose to hold some excess reserves to facilitate upcoming transactions or to meet contractual clearing balance requirements.

The total amount of FRB credits held in all FRB accounts for all commercial banks, together with all currency and vault cash, forms the M0 monetary base.

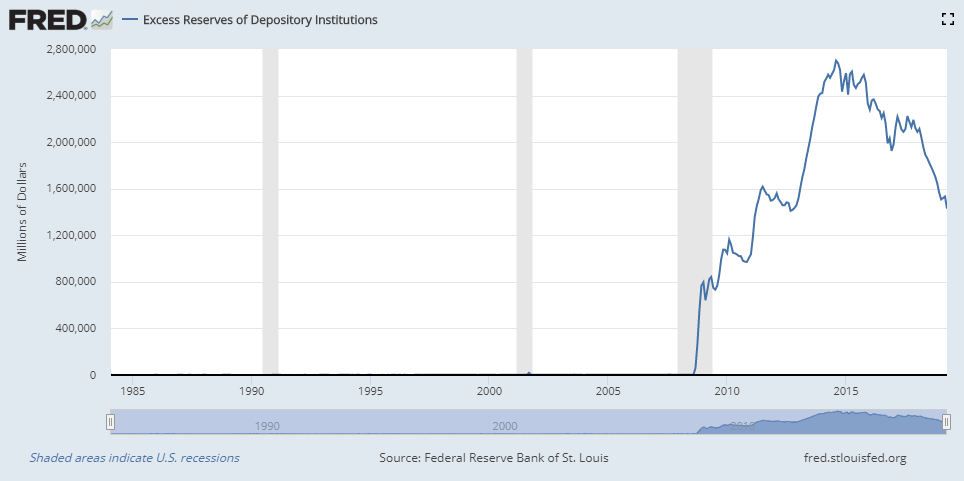
Excess Reserves in the U.S., 1984–2019

== Impact on inflation of excess reserve balances ==
Research by personnel at the Fed has resulted in claims that interest paid on reserves helps to guard against inflationary pressures. Under a traditional operating framework, in which central bank controls interest rates by changing the level of reserves and pays no interest on excess reserves, it would need to remove almost all of these excess reserves to raise market interest rates. Now when central bank pays interest on excess reserves the link between the level of reserves and willingness of commercial banks to lend is broken. It allows the central bank to raise market interest rates by simply raising the interest rate it pays on reserves without changing the quantity of reserves thus reducing lending growth and curbing economic activity.

Nobel-prize winning economist Eugene Fama contends that paying interest on reserves has (in effect) increased the supply of short-term debt, which through standard demand/supply effects would increase bond yields. The post-2008 financial crisis low interest-rate environment has therefore persisted in spite of, not because of the actions of the Federal Reserve. Specifically, the demand for risk-free assets (caused by the post-crisis 'flight to quality') has dominated the effect of paying interest on reserves on overall interest rates. He has also argued that paying interest on reserves has protected against hyperinflation of the US dollar.

== Interest on reserve balances ==
=== In the United States (2008–present) ===
The Financial Services Regulatory Relief Act of 2006 authorized the Federal Reserve Banks to pay interest on balances held by or on behalf of depository institutions at Reserve Banks, subject to regulations of the Board of Governors, effective October 1, 2011. The effective date of this authority was advanced by the Emergency Economic Stabilization Act of 2008.

On October 3, 2008, Section 128 of the Emergency Economic Stabilization Act of 2008 allowed the Federal Reserve banks to begin paying interest on excess reserve balances ("IOER") as well as required reserves. The Federal Reserve banks began doing so three days later. Banks had already begun increasing the amount of their money on deposit with the Fed at the beginning of September, up from about $10 billion total at the end of August, 2008, to $880 billion by the end of the second week of January, 2009.

In comparison, the increase in reserve balances reached only $65 billion after September 11 attacks before falling back to normal levels within a month. Former U.S. Treasury Secretary Henry Paulson's original bailout proposal under which the government would acquire up to $700 billion worth of mortgage-backed securities contained no provision to begin paying interest on reserve balances.

The day before the change was announced, on October 7, 2008, Chairman Ben Bernanke of the Board of Governors of the Federal Reserve System expressed some uncertainty about it, saying, "We're not quite sure what we have to pay in order to get the market rate, which includes some credit risk, up to the target. We're going to experiment with this and try to find what the right spread is." The Fed adjusted the rate on October 22, after the initial rate they set October 6 failed to keep the benchmark U.S. overnight interest rate close to their policy target, and again on November 5 for the same reason.

The Congressional Budget Office estimated that payment of interest on reserve balances would cost the American taxpayers about one tenth of the present 0.25% interest rate on $800 billion in deposits:

Estimated Budgetary Effects
Year	2006	2007	2008	2009	2010	2011	2012	2013	2014	2015	2016
Millions of dollars	0	-192	-192	-202	-212	-221	-242	-253	-266	-293	-308
(Negative numbers represent expenditures; losses in revenue not included.)

Beginning December 18, 2008, the Federal Reserve System directly established interest rates paid on required reserve balances and excess balances instead of specifying them with a formula based on the target federal funds rate. On January 13, Ben Bernanke said, "In principle, the interest rate the Fed pays on bank reserves should set a floor on the overnight interest rate, as banks should be unwilling to lend reserves at a rate lower than they can receive from the Fed. In practice, the federal funds rate has fallen somewhat below the interest rate on reserves in recent months, reflecting the very high volume of excess reserves, the inexperience of banks with the new regime, and other factors. However, as excess reserves decline, financial conditions normalize, and banks adapt to the new regime, we expect the interest rate paid on reserves to become an effective instrument for controlling the federal funds rate."

Also on January 13, 2009, Financial Week said Mr. Bernanke admitted that a huge increase in banks' excess reserves is stifling the Fed's monetary policy moves and its efforts to revive private sector lending. On January 7, 2009, the Federal Open Market Committee had decided that, "the size of the balance sheet and level of excess reserves would need to be reduced." On January 15, 2009, Chicago Federal Reserve Bank president and Federal Open Market Committee member Charles Evans said, "once the economy recovers and financial conditions stabilize, the Fed will return to its traditional focus on the federal funds rate. It also will have to scale back the use of emergency lending programs and reduce the size of the balance sheet and level of excess reserves. Some of this scaling back will occur naturally as market conditions improve on account of how these programs have been designed. Still, financial market participants need to be prepared for the eventual dismantling of the facilities that have been put in place during the financial turmoil".

At the end of January 2009, excess reserve balances within the Federal Reserve System stood at $793 billion but less than two weeks later on February 11, 2009, total reserve balances had fallen to $603 billion. On April 1, 2009, reserve balances had again increased to $806 billion. By August 2011, they had reached $1.6 trillion.

On March 20, 2013, excess reserves stood at $1.76 trillion. As the economy began to show signs of recovery in 2013, the Fed began to worry about the public relations problem that paying dozens of billions of dollars in interest on excess reserves (IOER) would cause when interest rates rise. St. Louis Fed president James B. Bullard said, "paying them something of the order of $50 billion [is] more than the entire profits of the largest banks." Bankers quoted in the Financial Times said the Fed could increase IOER rates more slowly than benchmark Fed funds rates, and reserves should be shifted out of the Fed and lent out by banks as the economy improves. Foreign banks have also steeply increased their excess reserves at the Fed which the Financial Times said could aggravate the Fed’s PR problem.

By October 2013, the excess reserves at the Federal Reserve had exceeded $2.3 trillion. When there are excess bank reserves fed funds are naturally near 0%. The Federal Reserve Bank was paying 0.25% in IOER very much within the requirements of the Sec. 201 of the Financial Services Regulatory Act of 2006. (A) IN GENERAL. - Balances maintained at a Federal Reserve bank by or on behalf of a depository institution may receive earnings to be paid by the Federal Reserve bank at least once each calendar quarter, at a rate or rates not to exceed the general level of short-term interest rates.

By July 2018, excess bank reserves had fallen to $1.8 trillion as the Federal Reserve Bank reduced its balance sheet and demand from the economy picked up. However, the Federal Reserve Bank was now paying 1.95% on IOER which was no longer within the requirements of paying a rate or rates not to exceed the general level of short-term interest rates. Paying 1.95% in IOER when fed funds are naturally near 0% was far more than Congress had ever intended. One of the unintended consequences were banks were no longer lending out their excess bank reserves but rather choosing to receive over $35 billion a year of risk-free interest from the Federal Reserve Bank.

=== Related measures ===
==== In Scandinavia (2009–present) ====
Sweden and Denmark have paid negative interest on excess reserves (effectively taxing banks for exceeding their reserve requirements) as an expansionary monetary policy measure. The Swedish Riksbank had previously paid positive interest rates on all overnight deposits.

==== In the United Kingdom (2009–present) ====
The Bank of England started to pay interest of 0.5% on reserves on 5 March 2009. Technically these are all excess reserves, because the United Kingdom does not have reserve requirements.

== See also ==
- Liquidity trap
- Quantitative easing
- Quantitative tightening
- Real interest rate
- Stagflation
- ZIRP
