= Shadow rate =

The shadow rate is an interest rate in some financial models. It is used to measure the economy when nominal interest rates come close to the zero lower bound. It was created by Fischer Black in his final paper, "Interest Rates as Options".

The shadow rate derives from Fischer Black's insight that currency is an option. If someone has money, the person can either (1) spend it today or (2) not spend it and have money tomorrow. Thus, when loans would return less money than was initially loaned out, investors will choose to "exercise the option" and not loan their money. Thus, the nominal short-term interest rate is always greater than or equal to zero. In Black's model, the shadow nominal short-term rate is what the nominal short-term rate would be if it was allowed to go below the zero lower bound.

When the shadow nominal short-term rate is positive, the nominal short-term rate is equal to the shadow rate. But when the shadow short-term rate is negative — such as during deflation or a bad recession with low inflation — the nominal short-term rate will diverge and stay above zero. In Black's model, even when nominal short-term interest rates stay close to zero, the long-term nominal interest rates can be well above zero. This is because nominal interest rates behave like options and there is some chance that the shadow short-term rate becomes positive in the future.

There is also a shadow real rate. The shadow real short-term rate is equal to the shadow nominal short-term rate minus expected inflation.

Fischer Black published his paper in 1995 and mentioned that the most recent time that the USA had experienced the zero lower bound was the Great Depression. Shadow rate models got renewed interest with the 2008 financial crisis when interest rates plunged to near zero and, even, below zero in some instances.

In contemporary macroeconomic terms, the concept, shadow irate, refers to an expansionary monetary environment during a period of zero ZLB. In such a period, when the central banks implement additional expansionary measures such as quantitative easing (QE), the monetary environment is actually more expansionary than implied by the nominal interest rate alone, and it is possible to calculate what nominal interest rate corresponds to the monetary environment. This interest is known as shadow interest.

== Models ==
Due to the option effect, the shadow short-term rate cannot be observed directly in the market. Economists use models to infer its value from its effect on longer-term interest rates in the yield curve. The value of the shadow short-term rate depends on assumptions about how interest rates move, so different models might calculate different values for it.

Jing Cynthia Wu and Fan Dora Xia's models were published in "Measuring the Macroeconomic Impact of Monetary Policy at the Zero Lower Bound" and in "Negative Interest Rate Policy and Yield Curve". Their rates are also available at the Federal Reserve Bank of Atlanta.

Leo Krippner's model was published in the book Zero Lower Bound Term Structure Modeling: A Practitioner’s Guide. His initial models were done while at the Reserve Bank of New Zealand.
