= Yield curve control =

Monetary policy tool

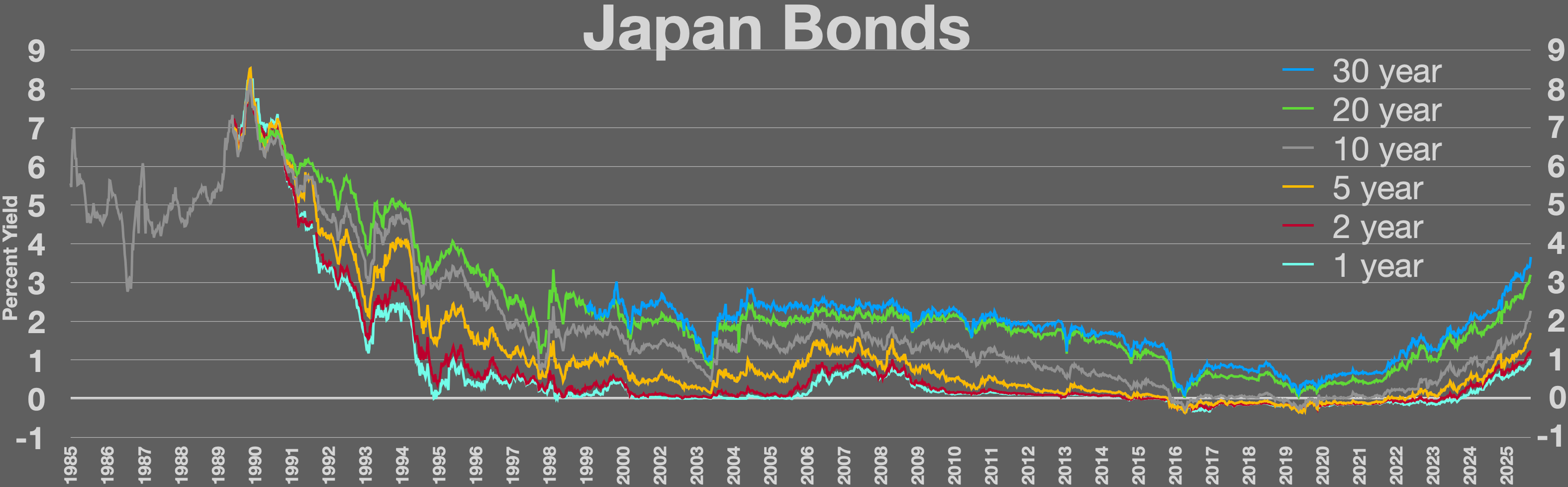
Japan bonds Inverted yield curve in 1990 Zero interest-rate policy started in 1999 Negative interest policy started in 2016 30 year 20 year 10 year 5 year 2 year 1 year

Yield curve control (YCC) is a monetary policy action whereby a central bank purchases variable amounts of government bonds or other financial assets in order to target yield curve or interest rates at a certain level. It generally means buying bonds at a slower rate than would occur under a quantitative easing policy. It affects long term interest rates, whereas QE is more impactful on shorter term interest rates. Where QE focuses on quantities of bonds, YCC is concerned with the price. It can be thought of as a more effective form of QE: In QE the central bank buys bonds, but does not have a target for what interest rate those purchases will bring. In YCC, the central bank intentionally buys enough bonds to reach a certain interest rate target.

Two examples of yield curve control can be found in the post-war United States, where bonds were purchased to keep interest rates low to allow cheaper government funding of the war effort, and in Japan, early 21st century, where bonds were purchased to keep long term interest rates at 0%, in an effort to stimulate the economy.

== See also ==
- Quantitative easing
- Inverted yield curve
