= Hard landing (disambiguation) =

Hard landing is an aircraft landing at a greater speed than normal.

Hard landing may also refer to:

- Hard landing (economics), an economy rapidly shifting from growth to flat as it approaches a recession
- Hard Landing (novel), a novel by the British author Stephen Leather
