= Soft landing (economics) =

Economic term

Proposed economic waves
Cycle/wave name	Period (years)
Kitchin cycle (inventory, e.g. pork cycle)	3–5
Juglar cycle (fixed investment)	7–11
Kuznets swing (infrastructural investment)	15–25
Kondratiev wave (technological basis)	45–60

A soft landing in the business cycle is the process of an economy shifting from growth to slow-growth to potentially flat, as it approaches but avoids a recession. It is usually caused by government attempts to slow down inflation. The criteria for distinguishing between a hard and soft landing are numerous and subjective.

The term was adapted to economics from its origins in the early days of flight, when it historically was the method of the landing of hot air balloons, by gradually reducing their buoyancy. It later also applied to aviation, gliders and spacecraft, as in the Lunar lander.

In the United States, modern recessions and hard and soft landings follow from Federal Reserve tightening cycles, in which the Federal funds rate is increased over several consecutive moves. In modern times, the most notable, and possibly the only true soft landing in the most recent 16 business cycles occurred in the soft landing of 1994, engineered by Federal Reserve Chairman Alan Greenspan through fine tuning of interest rates and the money supply. A soft landing by a central bank is when "the central bank tightens monetary policy to fight inflation but does not cause a recession". If it causes a recession, then it is a hard landing.

In addition to being a certain type of business cycle, a soft landing may also refer to a market segment or industry sector that is expected to slow down, but to not crash, while the wider economy may not experience such a slow down at that time. For example, a contemporary newspaper headline read "Soft landing forecast for house prices as rate hikes stem growth".

One of the main goals of the Joe Biden administration was to achieve a soft landing in order to avoid a recession. In 2024, economists estimated that the U.S. was successfully achieving a soft landing. By early 2024, the New York Times wrote that the United States stood out among economies worldwide in its strength and that the United States had successfully managed to reduce inflation without the kind of hardship that many economists had expected would occur. The United States was projected to achieve another soft landing as key economic benchmarks indicate after the second quarter of 2024 that inflation is projected to return to the Federal Reserve's target of 2% per annum without a recession occurring. However, by March 2025, a few weeks into Donald Trump's second presidency, it was reported that a soft landing was at risk due to implementation of extreme economic policies.

== See also ==
- Hard landing (economics)
- Recession
- Business cycle
- Inverted yield curve
