= Hard landing (economics) =

In the business cycle or economic cycle, a hard landing is an economy rapidly shifting from growth to slow-growth to flat as it approaches a recession, usually caused by government attempts to slow down inflation. It is distinguished from a soft landing, in which an economy's growth rate slows enough to control inflation, but remains high enough to avoid recession. The criteria for distinguishing between a hard and soft landing are numerous and subjective.

In the United States of America, modern recessions and hard and soft landings follow from Federal Reserve tightening cycles, in which the Federal funds rate is increased over several consecutive moves.

== See also ==
- Inverted yield curve
