= Zero interest-rate policy =

Policy regarding macroeconomic conditions

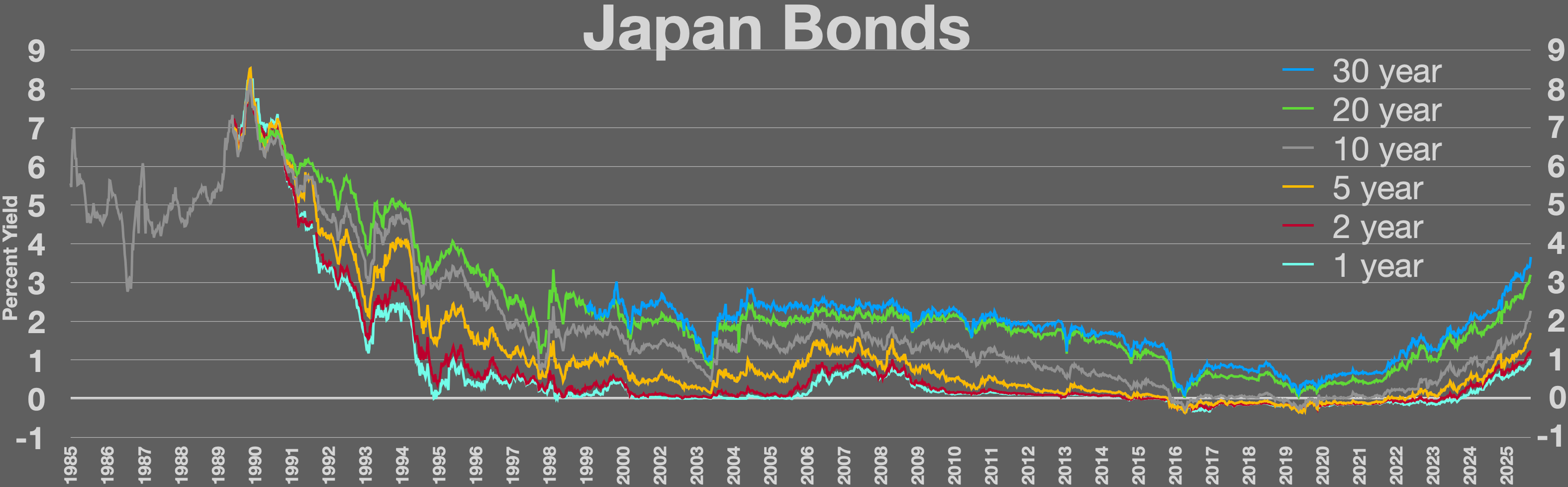
Japan bonds Inverted yield curve in 1990 Zero interest-rate policy starting in 1999 Negative interest policy started in 2016 30 year 20 year 10 year 5 year 2 year 1 year

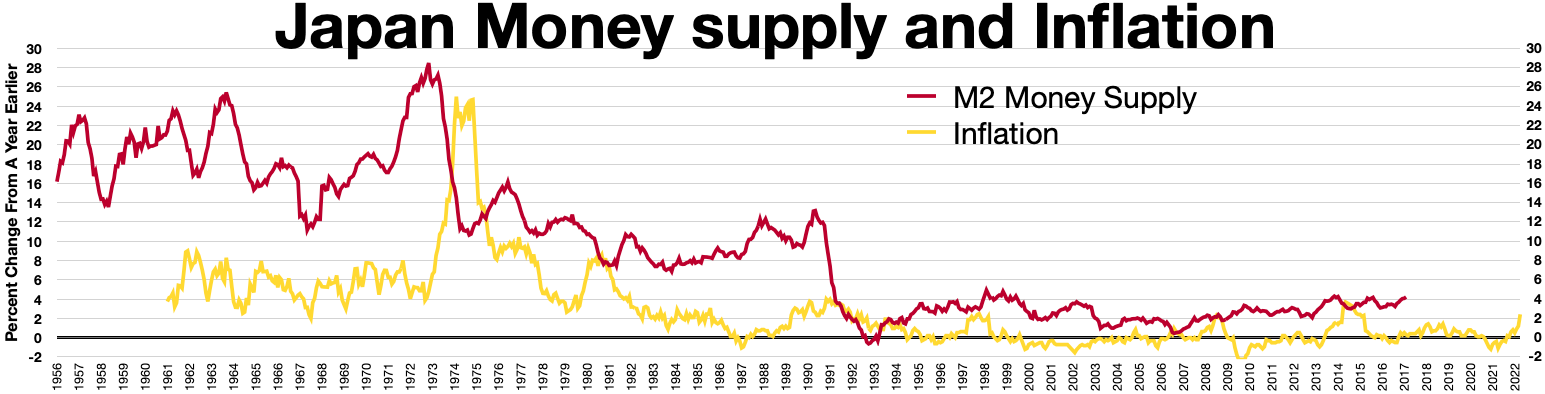
Japan money supply and inflation (year over year) M2 money supply Inflation

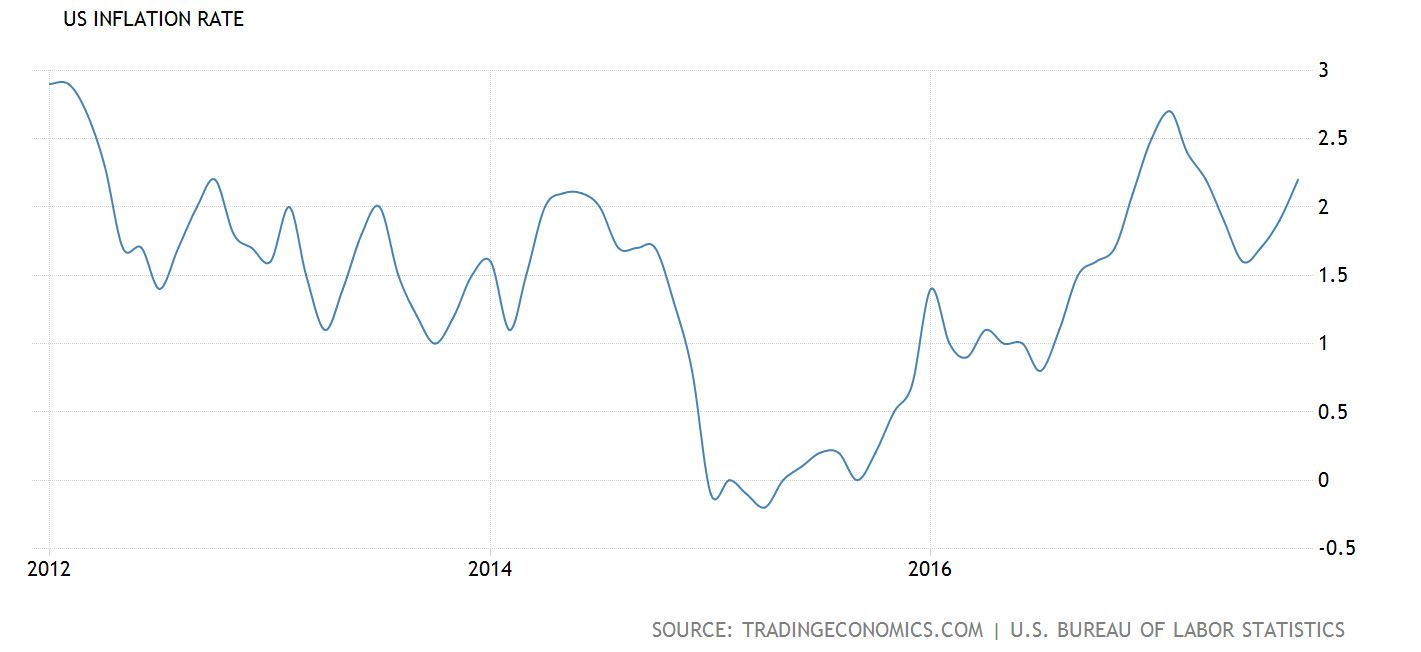
US inflation rates

Zero interest-rate policy (ZIRP) is a macroeconomic concept describing conditions with a very low nominal interest rate, such as those in contemporary Japan and in the United States from December 2008 through December 2015 and again from March 2020 until March 2022 amid the COVID-19 pandemic. ZIRP is considered to be an unconventional monetary policy instrument and can be associated with slow economic growth, deflation and deleverage. ZIRP could also describe an interest-free economy.

== Overview ==
Under ZIRP, the central bank maintains a 0% nominal interest rate. The ZIRP is an important milestone in monetary policy because the central bank is typically no longer able to reduce nominal interest rates. ZIRP is very closely related to the problem of a liquidity trap, where nominal interest rates cannot adjust downward at a time when savings exceed investment.

However, some economists—such as market monetarists—believe that unconventional monetary policy such as quantitative easing can be effective at the zero lower bound.

Others argue that when monetary policy is already used to the maximal extent, governments must be willing to use fiscal policy to create jobs. The fiscal multiplier of government spending is expected to be larger when nominal interest rates are zero than they would be when nominal interest rates are above zero. Keynesian economics holds that the multiplier is above one, meaning government spending effectively boosts output. In his paper on this topic, Michael Woodford finds that, in a ZIRP situation, the optimal policy for government is to spend enough in stimulus to cover the entire output gap.

Chris Modica and Warren Sulmasy find that the ZIRP policy follows from the need to refinance a high level of US public debt and from the need to recapitalize the world's banking system in the wake of the 2008 financial crisis.

== Zero lower bound ==
The zero lower bound problem refers to a situation in which the short-term nominal interest rate is zero, or just above zero, causing a liquidity trap and limiting the capacity that the central bank has for inflation targeting. This problem returned to prominence with Japan's experience during the 1990s and more recently with the American subprime crisis. Paul Krugman, Michael Woodford, and Milton Friedman argued that a zero nominal interest rate presents no problem for monetary policy, as a central bank can increase the monetary base only if it continues buying bonds.

== See also ==
- History of Federal Open Market Committee actions
- Janet Yellen
- Ben Bernanke
- Excess reserves
- Federal funds rate
- Forward guidance
- Millennial lifestyle subsidy
- Negative interest rate
- Natural rate of interest
- Real interest rate
- Stagflation
- Speculative bubble
- Too big to fail
- Yield curve control
