= Inverted yield curve =

Phenomenon when shorter term bonds yield higher interest rates than longer term bonds

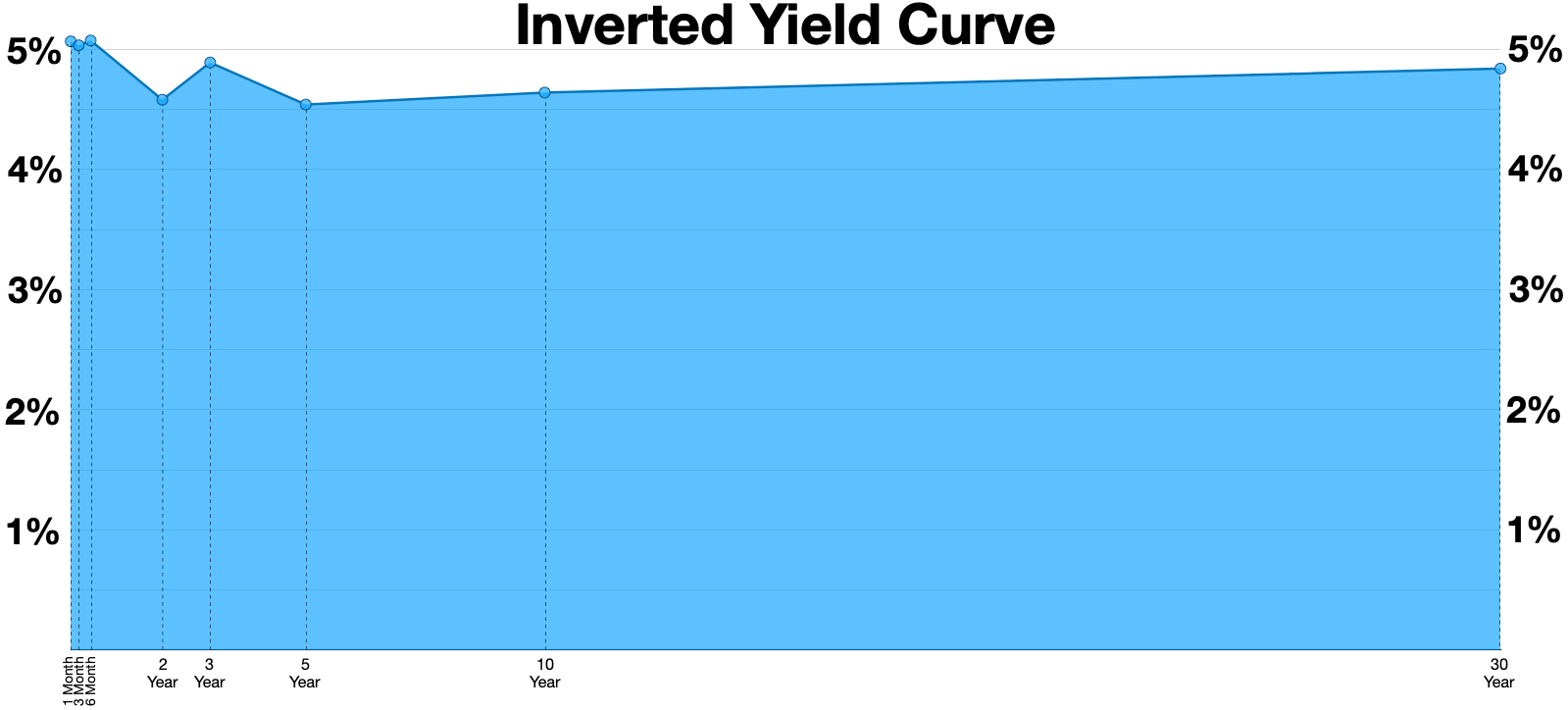
Inverted yield curve in December 2006

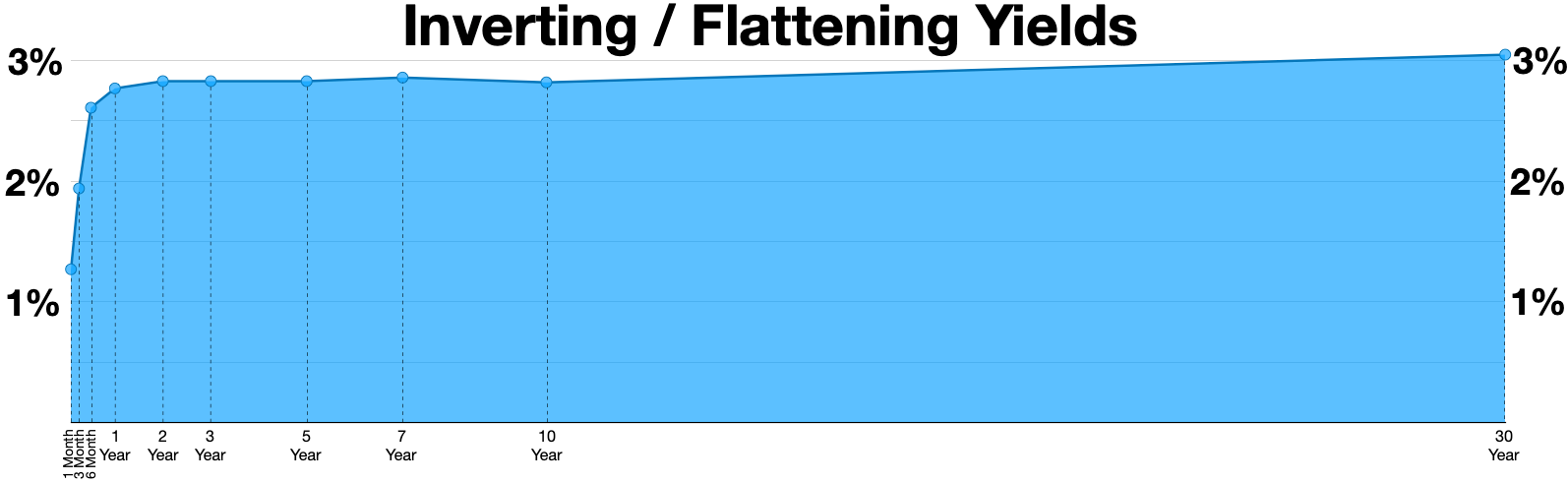
Inverting / flattening yields on July 6, 2022

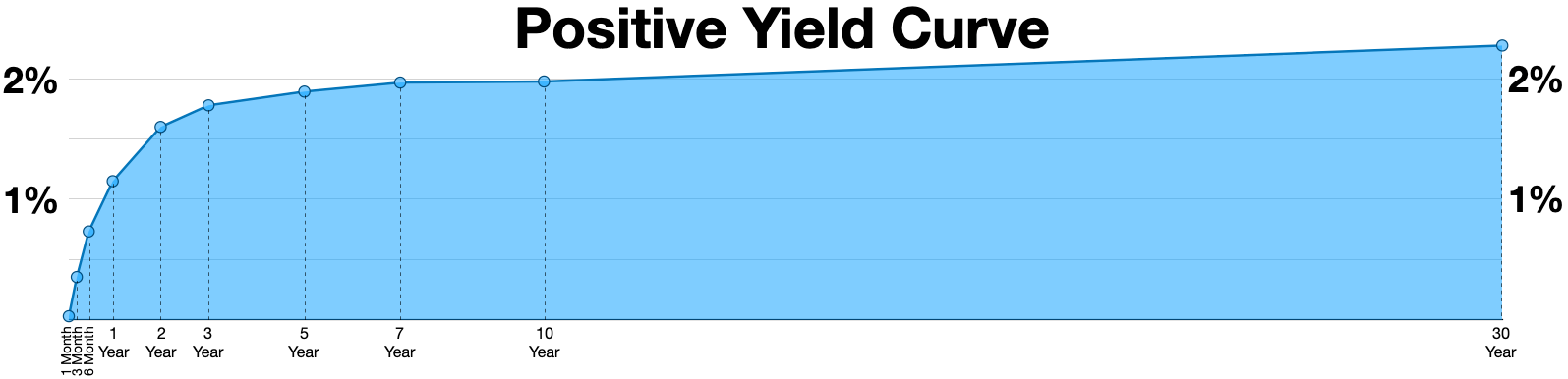
Positive yield curve on February 22, 2022

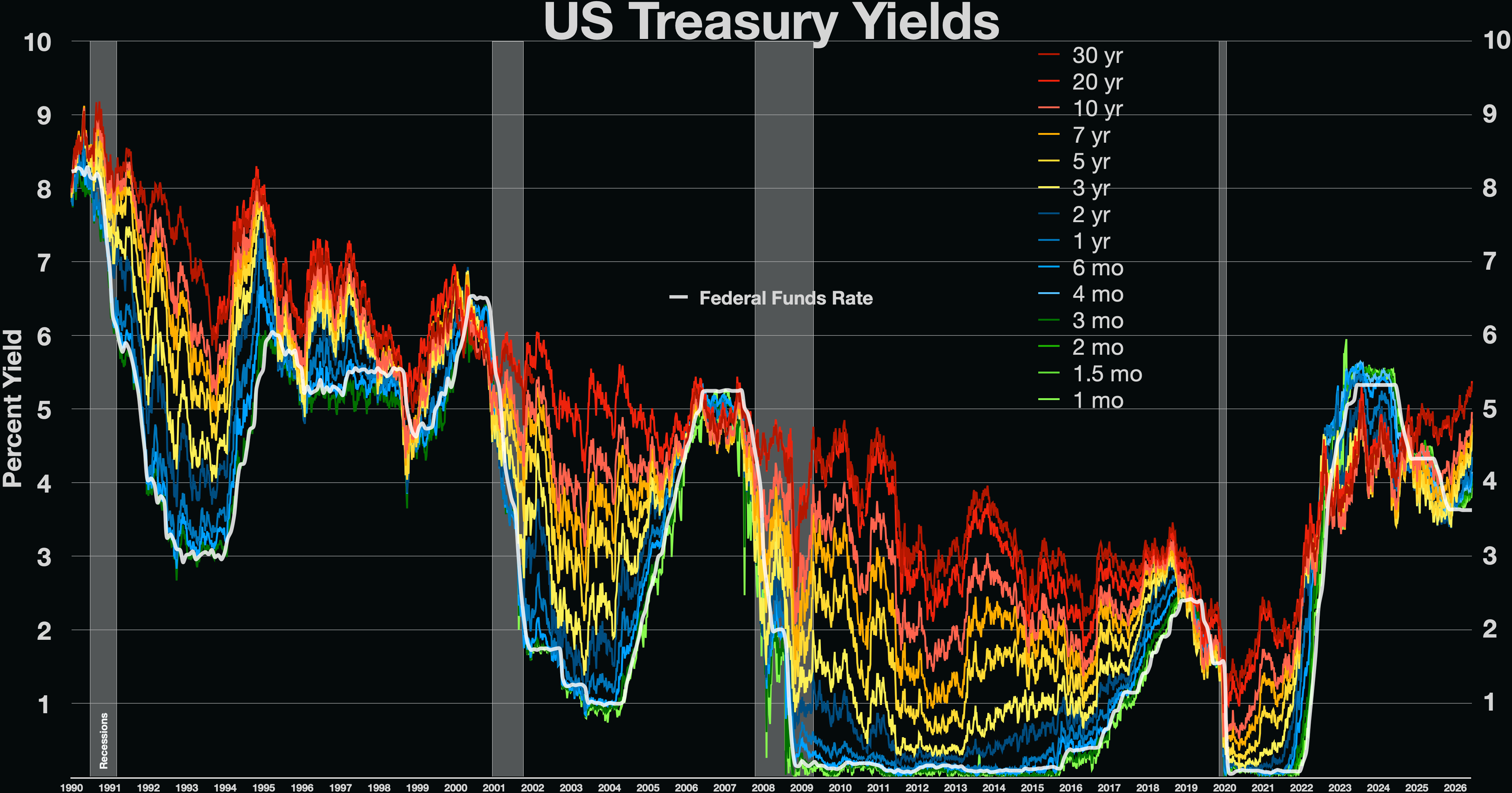
US Treasury interest rates compared to the Federal Funds Rate. When the shorter term treasuries get pushed above the longer term treasuries by the Federal Funds Rate it causes an inverted yield curve.

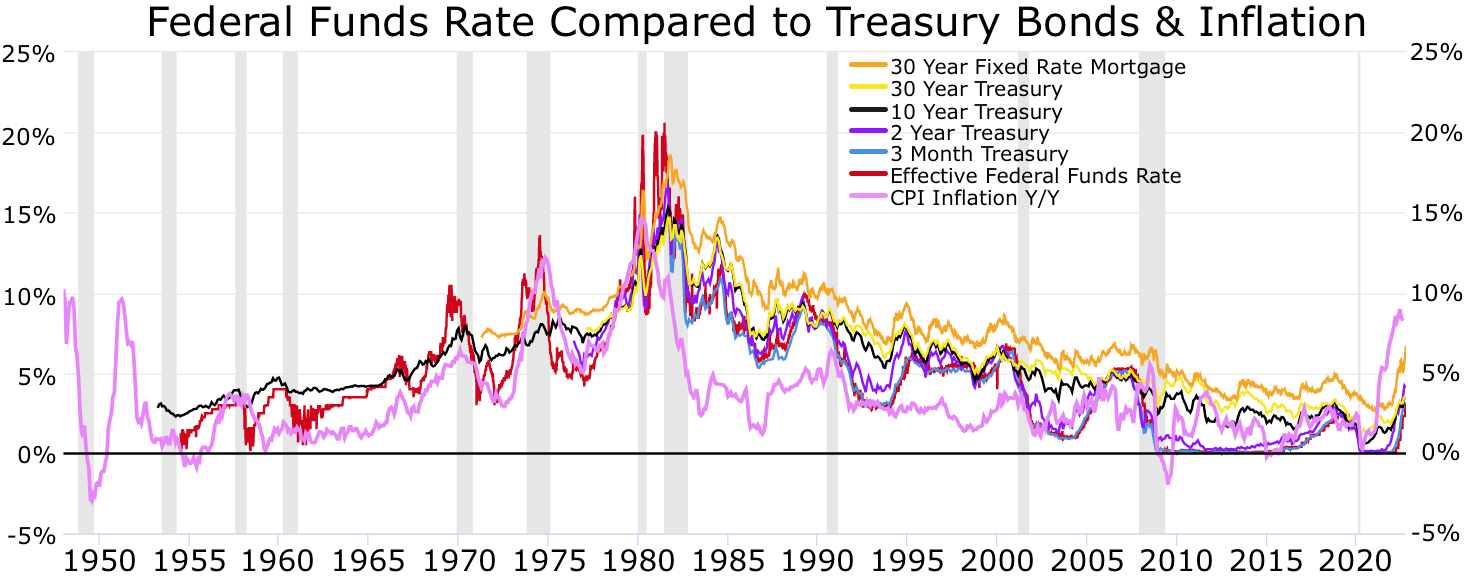
30 year mortgage average 30 Year Treasury Bond 10 Year Treasury Bond 2 Year Treasury Bond 3 month Treasury Bond Effective Federal Funds Rate CPI inflation year/year Recessions

In finance, an inverted yield curve is a yield curve in which short-term debt instruments (typically bonds) have a greater yield than longer term bonds. An inverted yield curve is an unusual phenomenon; bonds with shorter maturities generally provide lower yields than longer term bonds.

To determine whether the yield curve is inverted, it is a common practice to compare the yield on the 10-year U.S. Treasury bond to either a 2-year Treasury note or a 3-month Treasury bill. If the 10-year yield is less than the 2-year or 3-month yield, the curve is inverted.

== History ==
The term "inverted yield curve" was coined by the Canadian economist Campbell Harvey in his 1986 PhD thesis at the University of Chicago.

== Causes and significance ==
The Federal Open Market Committee of the Federal Reserve sets the Federal funds rate and when they raise the Federal funds rate above the longer term 10 and 30 year US Treasuries it causes the inverted yield curve, to get inflation and demand down, this also causes the job market to cool down and unemployment to rise. Short term treasuries such as the 1, 3, and 6 month bonds, closely follow the Federal funds rate, the longer term treasuries are more influenced by inflation levels.

There are several explanations of why the yield curve becomes inverted. The "expectations theory" holds that long-term rates depicted in the yield curve are a reflection of expected future short-term rates, which in turn reflect expectations about future economic conditions and monetary policy. In this view, an inverted yield curve implies that investors expect lower interest rates at some point in the future –for example, when the economy is expected to enter a recession and the Federal Reserve reduces interest rates to stimulate the economy and pull it out of recession. In that scenario, expected future short-term rates fall below current short-term rates, and the yield curve inverts.

A related explanation holds that when investors who value interest income expect recession, a shift in Federal Reserve policy and lower interest rates, they try to lock in long-term yields to protect their income stream. The resulting demand for longer-term bonds drives up their prices, reducing long-term yields.

== Business cycles ==
The inverted yield curve is the contraction phase in the Business cycle or Credit cycle when the federal funds rate and treasury interest rates are high to create a hard or soft landing in the cycle. When the Federal funds rate and interest rates are lowered after the economic contraction (to get price and commodity stabilization) this is the growth and expansion phase in the business cycle. The Federal Reserve only indirectly controls the money supply and it is the banks themselves that create new money when they make loans (Debt based monetary system). By manipulating interest rates with the Federal funds rate and Repurchase agreement (Repo Market) the Fed tries to control how much new money banks create.

== As a leading indicator ==
It has often been said that the inverted yield curve has been one of the most reliable leading indicators for economic recession during the post–World War II era. Proponents of this position maintain that inversion tends to predate a recession 7 to 24 months in advance. Others are skeptical, for example stating that the inverted yield curve is "not necessarily" a reliable metric for predicting recession, or that it has predicted "nine of the past five" recessions.

In 2023, inversion during a labor shortage and low indebtedness raised questions over whether widespread awareness of its predictive power made it less predictive.

The longest and deepest Treasury yield curve inversion in history began in July 2022, as the Federal Reserve sharply increased the fed funds rate to combat the 2021–2023 inflation surge. Despite widespread predictions by economists and market analysts of an imminent recession, none materialized, economic growth remained steady, and a Reuters survey of economists that month found they expected the economy to continue growing for the next two years. An earlier survey of bond market strategists found a majority no longer believed an inverted curve to be a reliable recession predictor. The curve began re-steepening toward positive territory in June 2024, as it had at other points during that inversion; in every previous inversion they examined, Deutsche Bank analysts found the curve had re-steepened before a recession began. The spread returned to positive territory in early September 2024, ending the inversion.

== Inverted yield curves outside the US ==
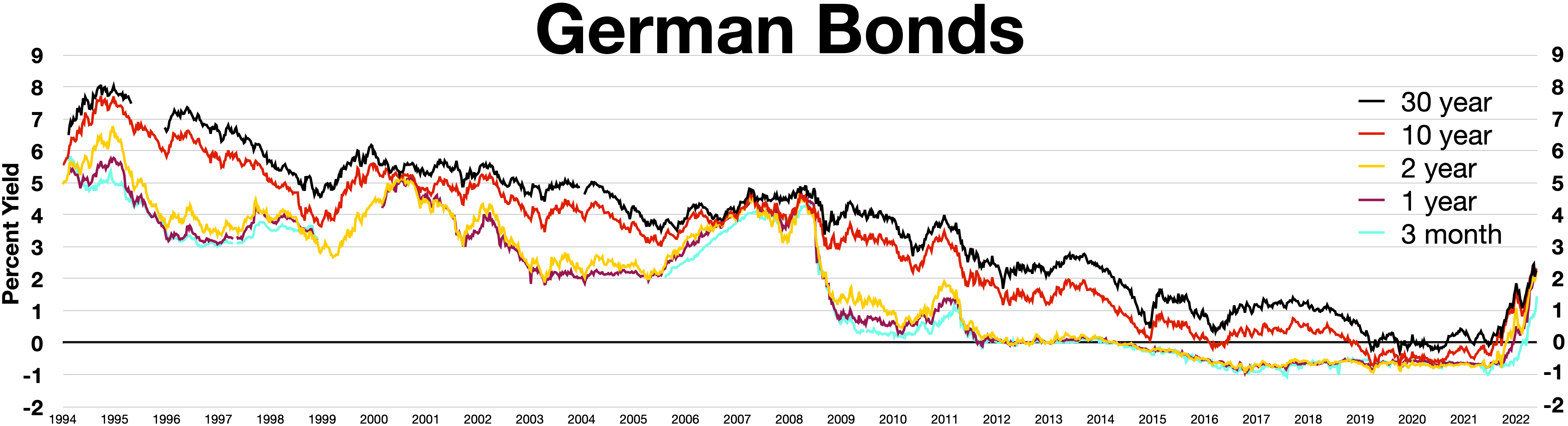
German bonds Inverted yield curve in 2008 and Negative interest rates 2014–2022 30 year 10 year 2 year 1 year 3 month

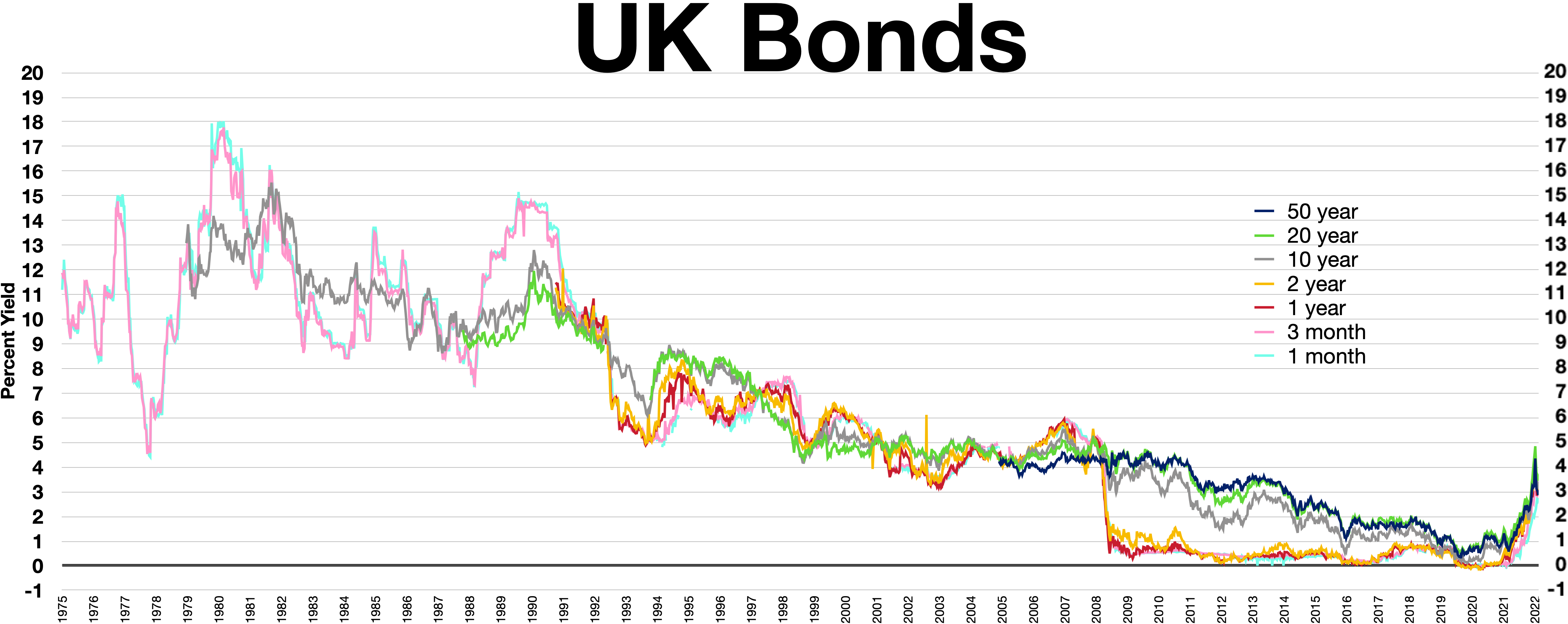
United Kingdom bonds 50 year 20 year 10 year 2 year 1 year 3 month 1 month

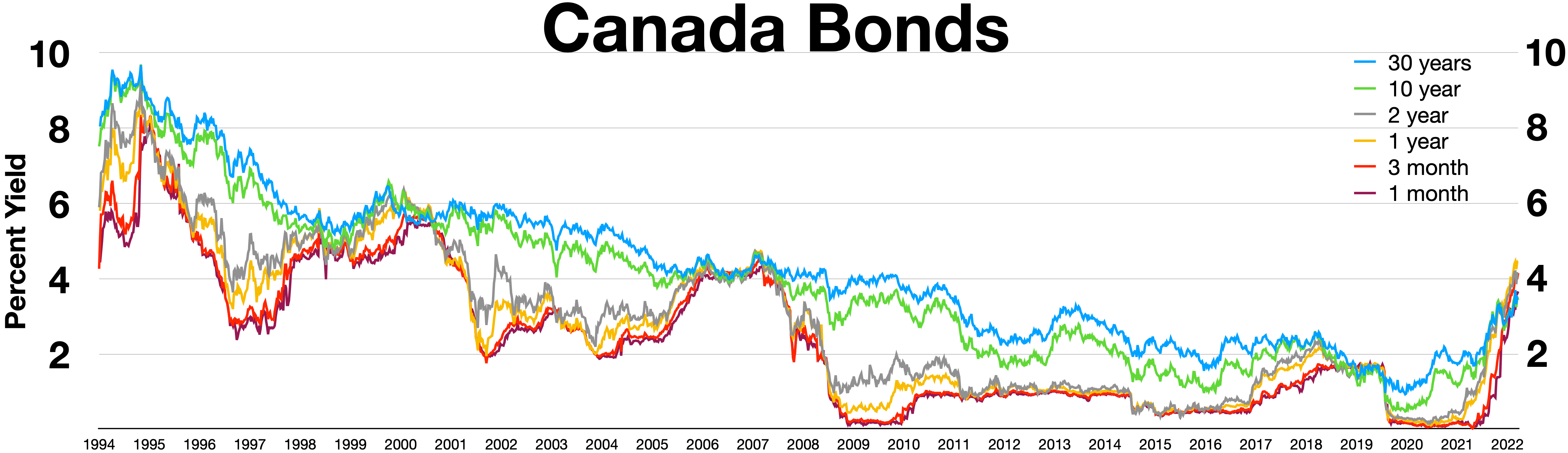
Canada bonds 30 year 10 year 2 year 1 year 3 month 1 month

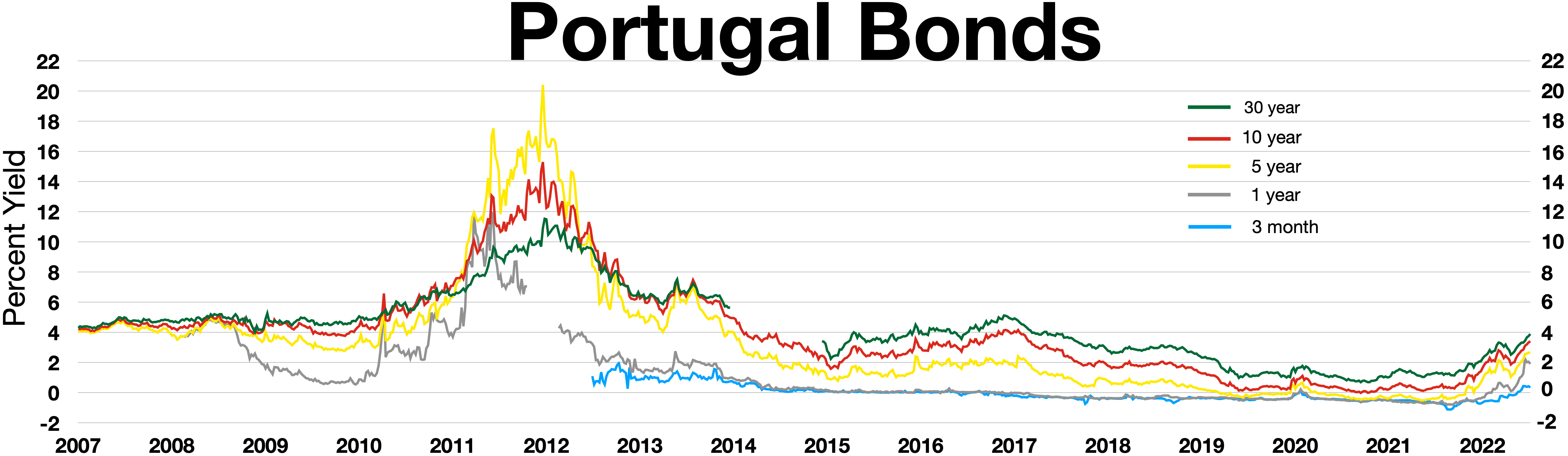
Portugal bonds during the Euro area crisis 30 year bond 10 year bond 5 year bond 1 year bond 3 month bond

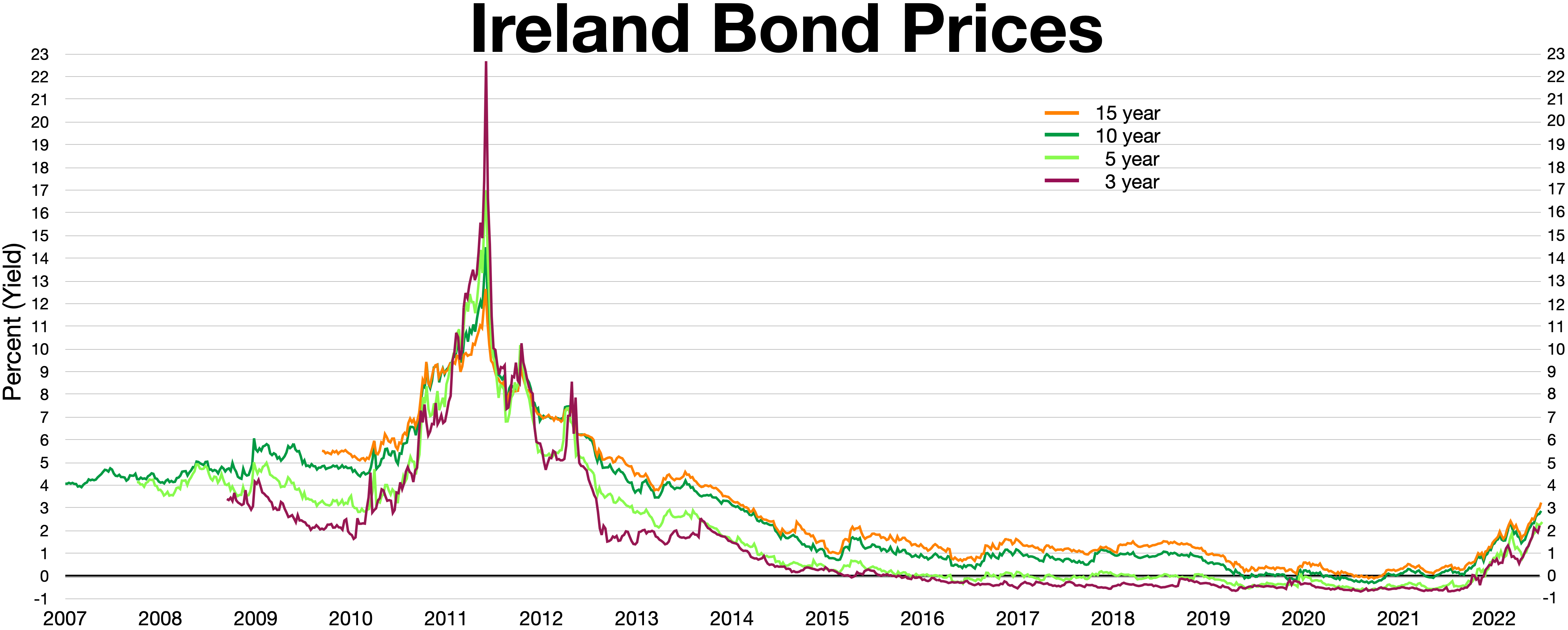
Ireland bond prices, Inverted yield curve in 2011 during the Euro area crisis and Ireland banking crisis And rates went negative after the Euro area crisis 15 year bond 10 year bond 5 year bond 3 year bond

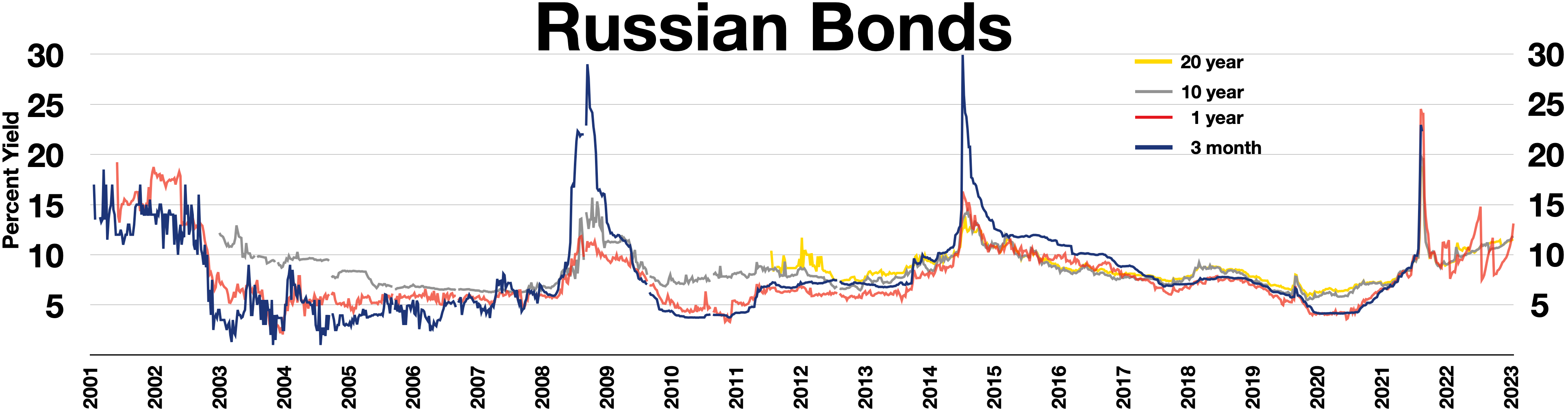
Russian bonds, Inverted yield curves to tame inflation during their wars (Russo-Georgian War, Russo-Ukrainian War, 2022 Russian invasion of Ukraine) 20 year bond 10 year bond 1 year bond 3 month bond

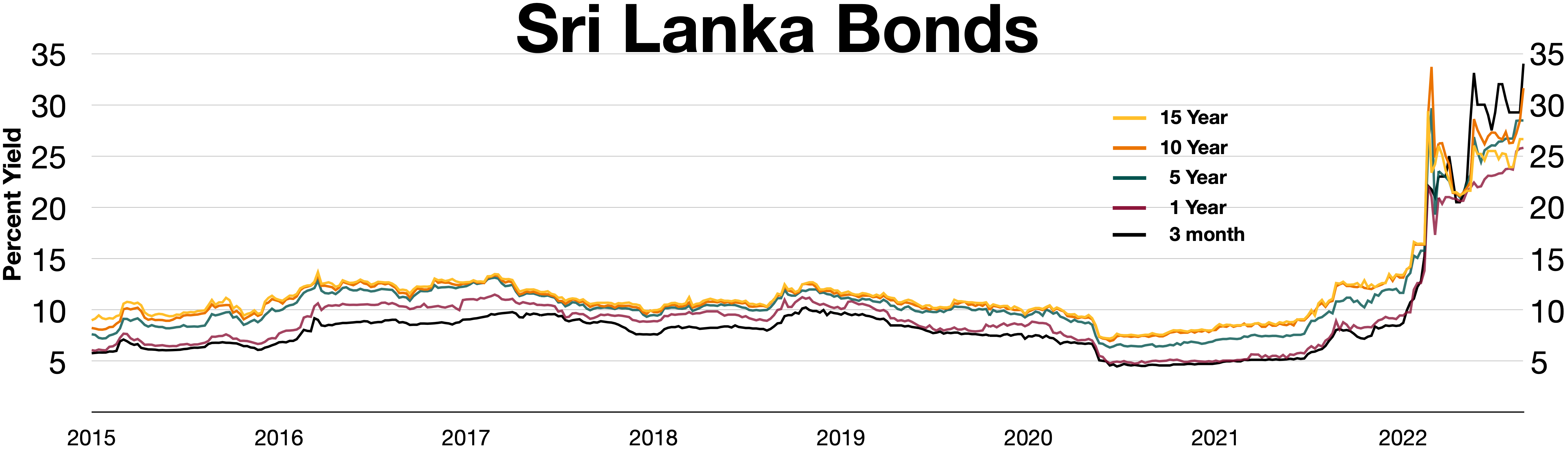
Sri Lanka bonds spiked in 2022 Inverted yield curve in the first half of 2022 during Sri Lankan economic crisis 15 year bonds 10 year bonds 5 year bonds 1 year bonds 6 month bonds

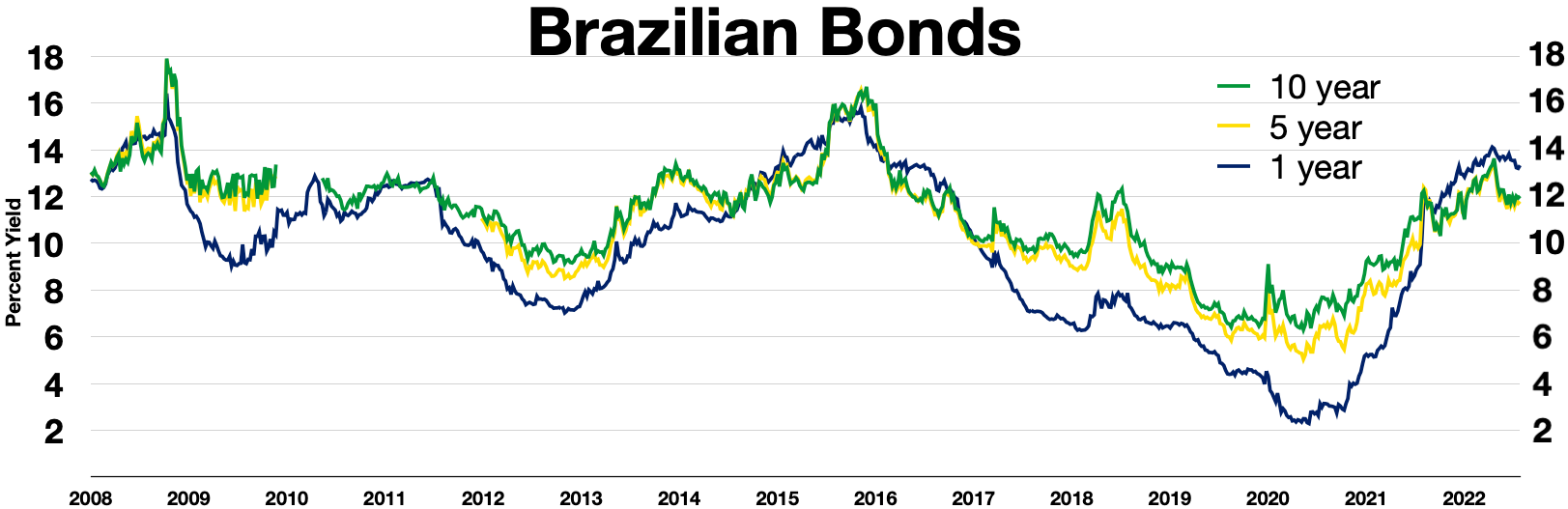
Brazilian bonds had an Inverted yield curve starting in August 2014 as part of the 2014 Brazilian economic crisis 10 year bond 5 year bond 1 year bond

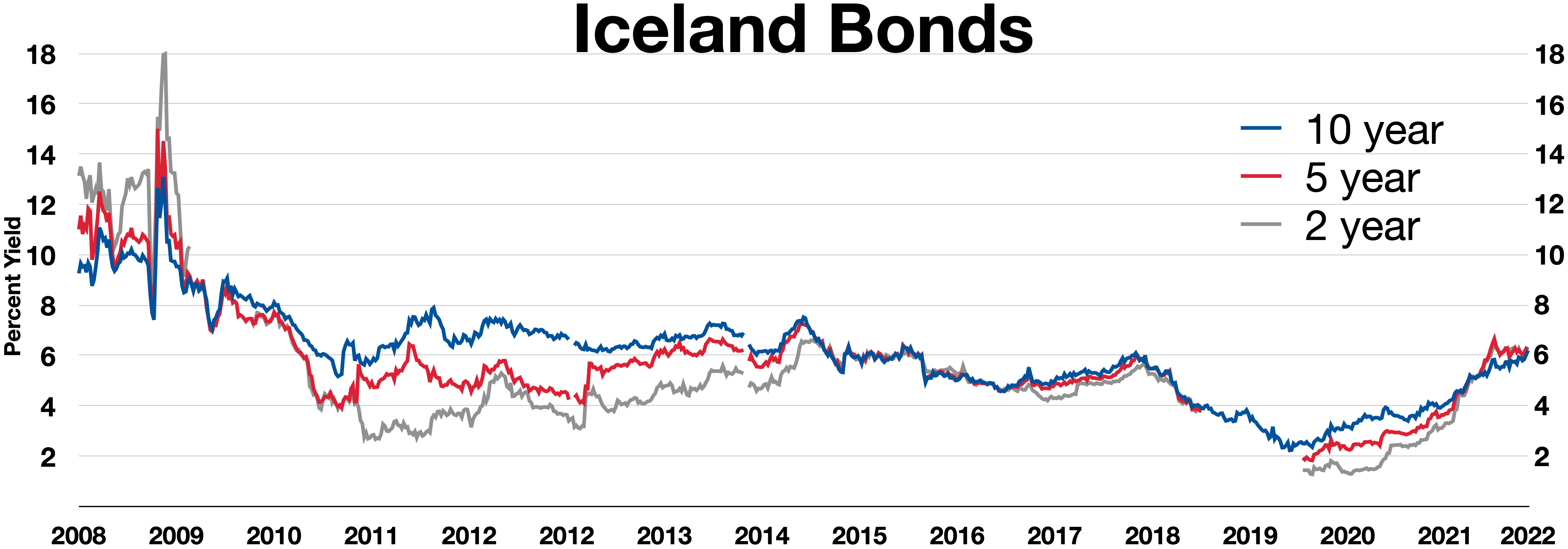
Iceland bonds had an Inverted yield curve in 2008 during the 2008–2011 Icelandic financial crisis 10 year bonds 5 year bonds 2 year bonds

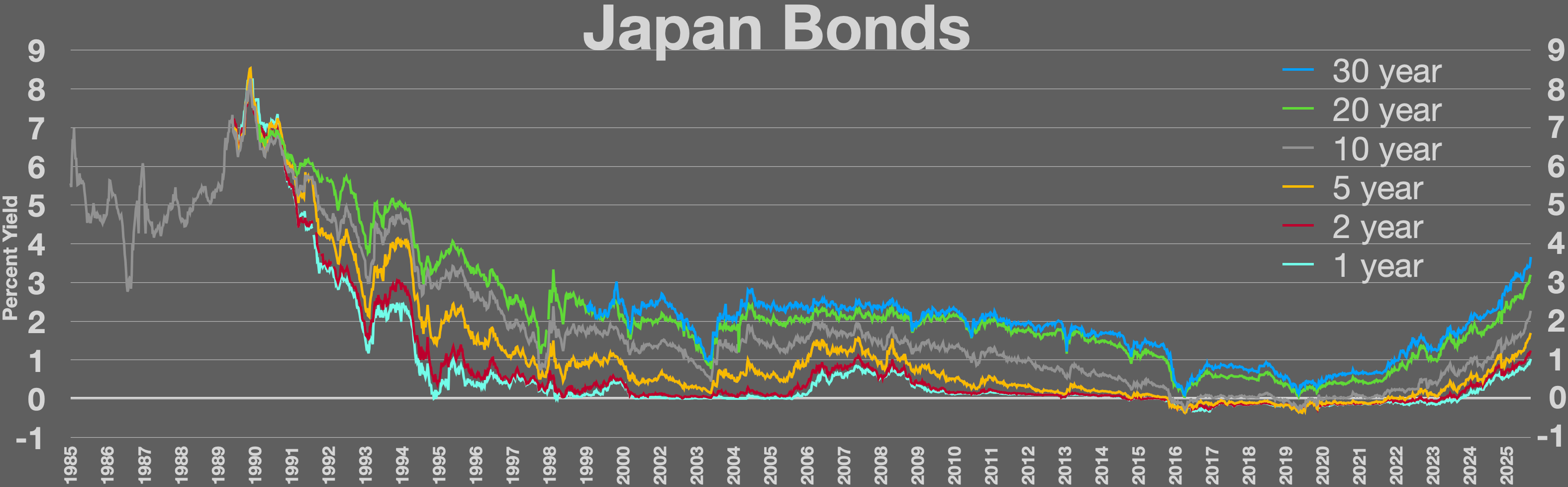
Japan bonds Inverted yield curve in 1990 Zero interest-rate policy starting in 1999 Negative interest policy started in 2016 30 year 20 year 10 year 5 year 2 year 1 year

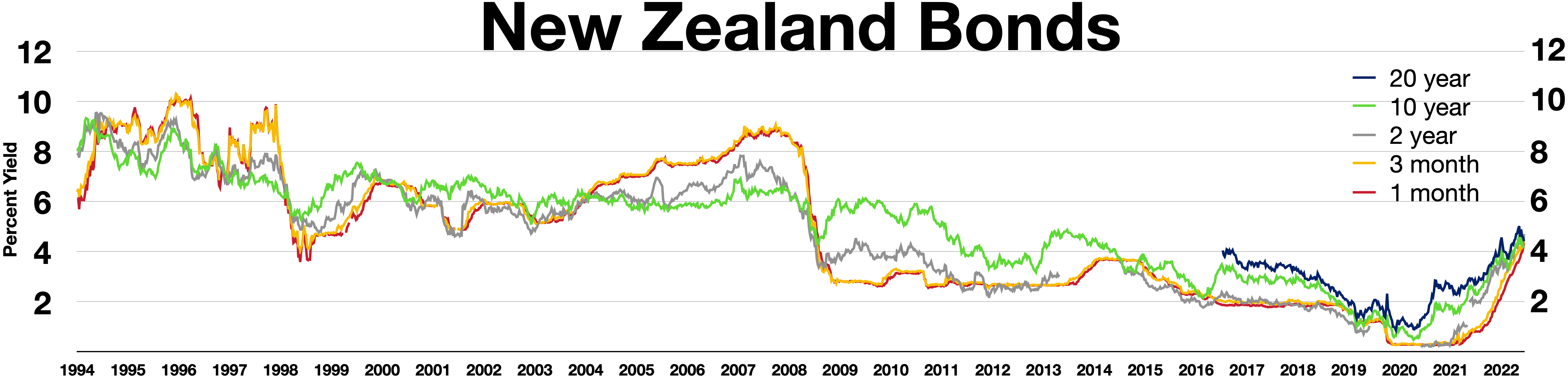
New Zealand bonds Inverted yield curve in 1994–1998 and 2004–2008 20 year 10 year 2 year 3 month 1 month

== See also ==
- Austrian business cycle theory
- Friedman's k-percent rule
- Zero interest-rate policy
- 1970s commodities boom
- 2000s commodities boom
- 2020s commodities boom
- Monetary sovereignty
- Sahm rule - Economic indicator predicting recessions
- Yield curve control
- Taylor rule
