= Negative interest on excess reserves =

Instrument of monetary policy

Negative interest on excess reserves is an instrument of unconventional monetary policy applied by central banks to encourage lending by making it costly for commercial banks to hold their excess reserves at central banks so they will lend more readily to the private sector. Such a policy is usually a response to very slow economic growth, deflation, and deleveraging.

During economic downturns, central banks often lower interest rates to stimulate growth. Until late in the 20th century, it was thought that rates could not go below zero because banks would hold onto cash instead of paying a fee to deposit it. It turns out this was not quite right. Central banks in Europe and in Japan have demonstrated rates can go negative, and several have pushed them in that direction for the same reason they lowered them to zero in the first place: to provide stimulus and, where inflation is below target, to raise the inflation rate. The notion is that negative rates will provide even more incentive for commercial banks to make loans. Potential lending projects by a bank not worth funding (even in a low-interest-rate environment) might now look attractive. If the alternative for the bank is to be charged to store money at the central bank or simply holding cash in deposits, this scenario would play out.

== Examples ==
=== Europe ===
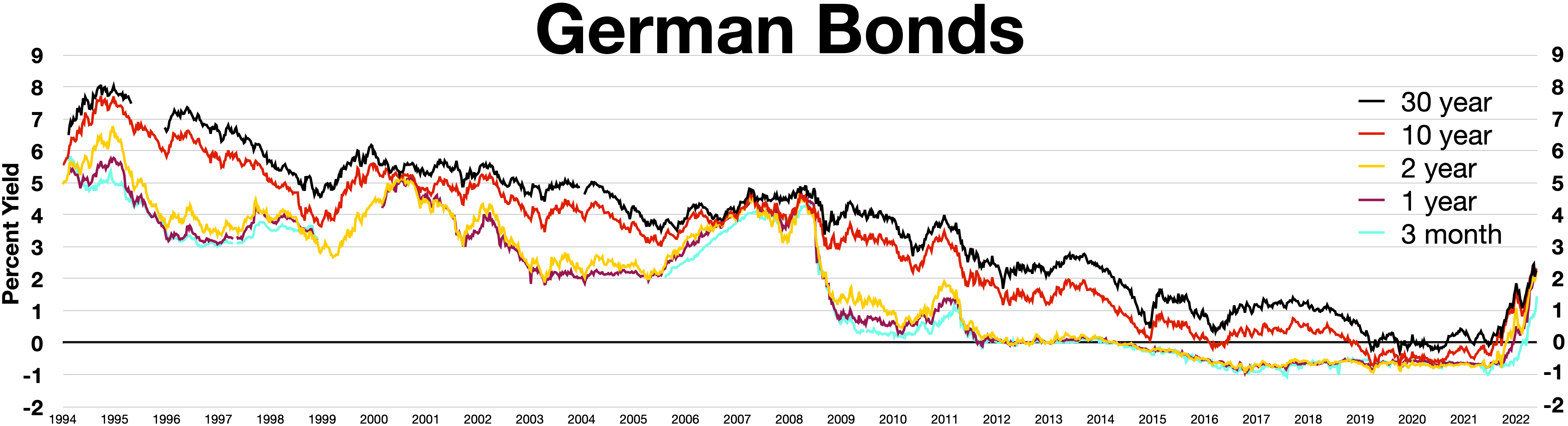
German bonds Inverted yield curve in 2008 and Negative interest rates 2014–2022 30 year 10 year 2 year 1 year 3 month

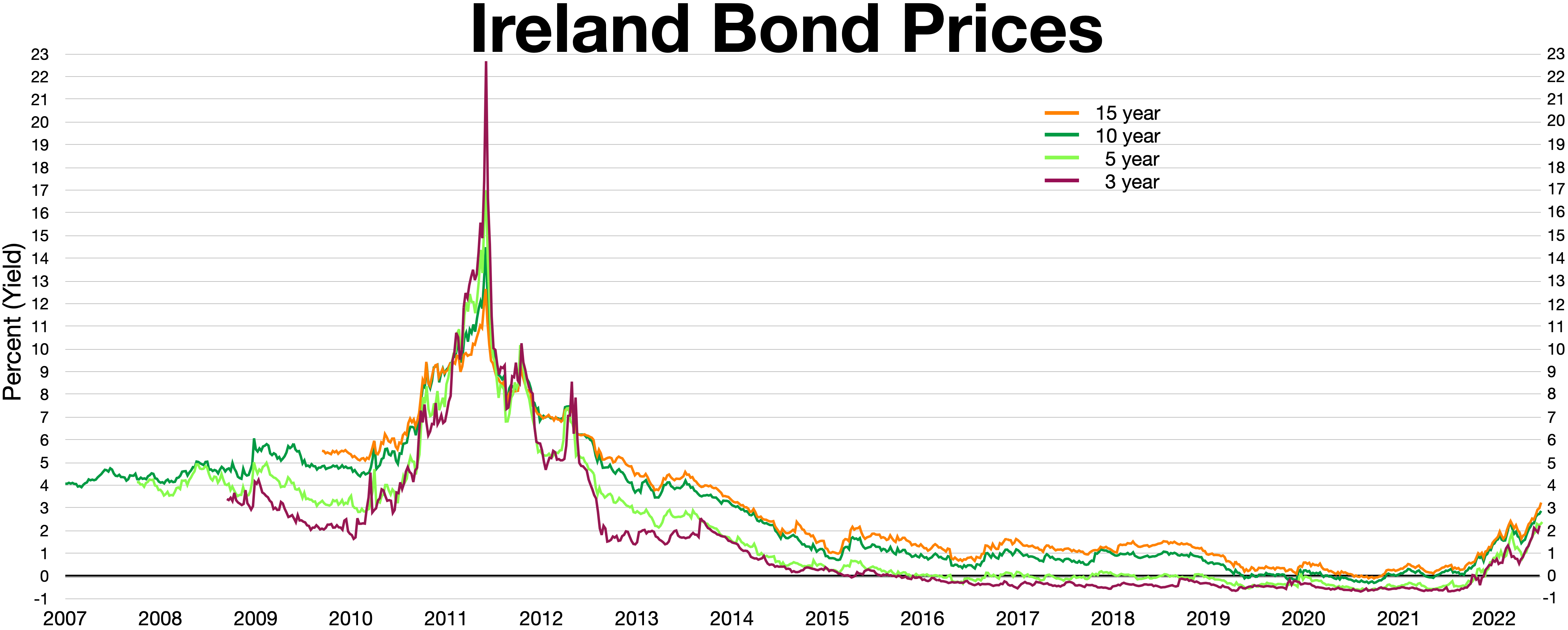
Ireland bond prices, Inverted yield curve in 2011, And rates went negative after the European debt crisis 15 year bond 10 year bond 5 year bond 3 year bond

The European Central Bank and central banks of other European countries, such as Sweden, Switzerland, and Denmark, have paid negative interest on excess reserves—in effect taxing banks for exceeding their reserve requirements—as an expansionary monetary policy measure.

Negative rates in Europe have been controversial. Ambrose Evans-Pritchard of the London Telegraph has described them as a "calamitous misadventure". Economists for the European Central Bank argue that across the euro area, loans from banks to corporations have become less expensive since negative rates were adopted.

=== Japan ===
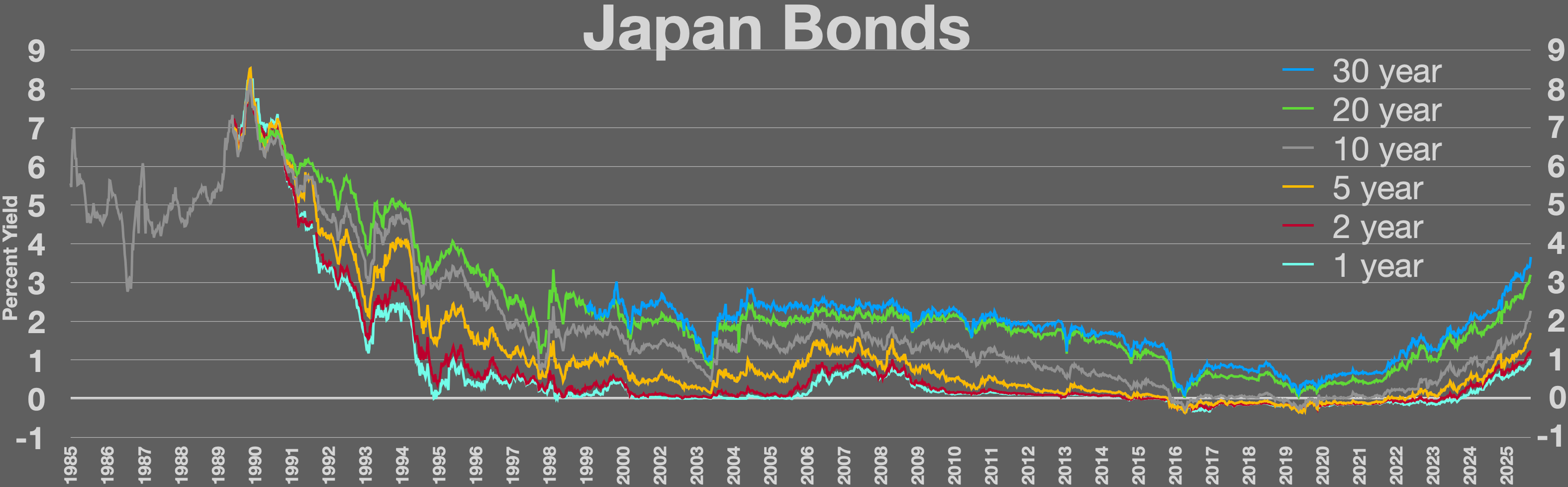
Japan bonds Inverted yield curve in 1990 Zero interest-rate policy started in 1999 Negative interest policy started in 2016 30 year 20 year 10 year 5 year 2 year 1 year

In January 2016, the Bank of Japan followed European central banks and lowered its interest rates below zero, after several years of keeping them at the lower end of the positive range. The existing balances will keep on yielding a rate of 0.1 percent; the reserves that banks are required to keep at the BOJ will have a rate of zero percent, and a rate of minus 0.1 percent will be applied to any other reserves.

=== United States ===
The staff of the U.S. Federal Reserve prepared a memo for the Federal Open Market Committee in August 2010 evaluating the possibility of lowering the interest rate that the Fed paid on bank reserves to zero or below. The staff was lukewarm on the idea, and it was never adopted in the U.S. Former chairman of the Federal Reserve Ben Bernanke has argued that "negative rates appear to have both modest benefits and manageable costs" and "modestly negative" interest rates should be an option for the Fed to consider if it ever again confronts a very weak economy at a time when short-term interest rates already have been cut to zero.

== See also ==
- Constant purchasing power accounting
- Excess reserves
- Forward guidance
- IOER – interest on excess reserves
- Negative interest rate
- Quantitative tightening
- Zero interest rate policy (ZIRP)
- Financial market impact of the COVID-19 pandemic
