= Inflation targeting =

Monetary policy on interest rates

In macroeconomics, inflation targeting is a monetary policy where a central bank follows an explicit target for the inflation rate for the medium-term and announces this inflation target to the public. The assumption is that the best that monetary policy can do to support long-term growth of the economy is to maintain price stability, and price stability is achieved by controlling inflation. The central bank uses short-term interest rates as its main monetary instrument.

An inflation-targeting central bank will raise or lower interest rates based on above-target or below-target inflation, respectively. The conventional wisdom is that raising interest rates usually cools the economy to rein in inflation; lowering interest rates usually accelerates the economy, thereby boosting inflation. The first three countries to implement fully-fledged inflation targeting were New Zealand, Canada and the United Kingdom in the early 1990s, although Germany had adopted many elements of inflation targeting earlier. As of 2024, inflation targeting has been adopted by 45 individual countries and the Euro Area as their monetary policy framework.

== History ==
Early proposals of monetary systems targeting the price level or the inflation rate, rather than the exchange rate, followed the general crisis of the gold standard after World War I. Irving Fisher proposed a "compensated dollar" system in which the gold content in paper money would vary with the price of goods in terms of gold, so that the price level in terms of paper money would stay fixed. Fisher's proposal was a first attempt to target prices while retaining the automatic functioning of the gold standard. In his Tract on Monetary Reform (1923), John Maynard Keynes advocated what we would now call an inflation targeting scheme. In the context of sudden inflations and deflations in the international economy right after World War I, Keynes recommended a policy of exchange-rate flexibility, appreciating the currency as a response to international inflation and depreciating it when there are international deflationary forces, so that internal prices remained more or less stable. Interest in inflation targeting waned during the Bretton Woods era (1944–1971), as they were inconsistent with the exchange rate pegs that prevailed during three decades after World War II.

=== New Zealand ===
Inflation targeting was pioneered in New Zealand in 1990. The government and the Reserve Bank of New Zealand adopted a Policy Target Agreement (PTA) in March 1990 in which the Reserve Bank of New Zealand would pursue an inflation target range of 0 to 2 percent.

=== Canada ===
Canada was the second country to formally adopt inflation targeting in February 1991.

=== United Kingdom ===
The United Kingdom adopted inflation targeting in October 1992 after exiting the European Exchange Rate Mechanism. The Bank of England's Monetary Policy Committee was given sole responsibility in 1998 for setting interest rates to meet the Government's Retail Prices Index (RPI) inflation target of 2.5%. The target changed to 2% in December 2003 when the Consumer Price Index (CPI) replaced the Retail Prices Index as the UK Treasury's inflation index. If inflation overshoots or undershoots the target by more than 1%, the Governor of the Bank of England is required to write a letter to the Chancellor of the Exchequer explaining why, and how he will remedy the situation. The success of inflation targeting in the United Kingdom has been attributed to the bank's focus on transparency. The Bank of England has been a leader in producing innovative ways of communicating information to the public, especially through its Inflation Report, which have been emulated by many other central banks.

=== European Central Bank ===
Although the ECB does not consider itself to be an inflation-targeting central bank, after the inception of the euro in January 1999, the objective of the European Central Bank (ECB) has been to maintain price stability within the Eurozone. The Governing Council of the ECB in October 1998 defined price stability as inflation of under 2%, "a year-on-year increase in the Harmonised Index of Consumer Prices (HICP) for the euro area of below 2%" and added that price stability "was to be maintained over the medium term". The Governing Council confirmed this definition in May 2003 following a thorough evaluation of the ECB's monetary policy strategy. On that occasion, the Governing Council clarified that "in the pursuit of price stability, it aims to maintain inflation rates below, but close to, 2% over the medium term". Since then, the numerical target of 2% has become common for major developed economies, including the United States (since January 2012) and Japan (since January 2013).

On 8 July 2021, the ECB changed its inflation target to a symmetrical 2% over the medium term. Symmetry in the inflation target means that the Governing Council considers negative and positive deviations of inflation from the target to be equally undesirable.

=== Emerging markets ===
In 2000, Frederic S. Mishkin concluded that "although inflation targeting is not a panacea and may not be appropriate for many emerging market countries, it can be a highly useful monetary policy strategy in a number of them".

==== Armenia ====
The Central Bank of Armenia (CBA) announced in 2006 that it will implement an inflation targeting strategy. The process of full transition to inflation targeting was supposed to end in 2008. Operational, macroeconomic and institutional preconditions for inflation targeting should have been met to ensure a full transition. CBA believes that it has managed to meet all the preconditions successfully and should concentrate on building a public trust in the new monetary policy regime. A specific model has been developed to estimate CBA's reaction function and the results showed that the inertia of inflation rate and interest rate are most vital in the reaction function. This can be an evidence that the announcement of the strategy is a trustworthy commitment. There are people who claim that inflation targeting is too restrictive for dealing with positive supply shocks. On the other hand, the IMF claims that inflation targeting strategy is good for developing economies, however it requires a lot of information for forecasting.

The Central Bank continued to pursue a policy of tightening monetary conditions during the reporting period, increasing the policy interest rate by a total of 2.75 percentage points. At the same time, about half of the tightening, 1.25 percentage points, was carried out in 2022 in March, reacting to the high inflation situation formed in the case of unprecedented uncertainties.

Being constantly hit by external shocks to the national economy over the past three years, Armenia is still on the path of recovery thanks to economic management efforts. According to the 3-year Stand-By Arrangement, which came to its end on May 16, 2022, important structural and institutional reforms have been implemented. Those include improvement of tax compliance, budget process refinement, strengthening the stability of financial sector and most importantly fostering the inflation targeting framework.

==== Chile ====
In Chile, a 20% inflation rate pushed the Central Bank of Chile to announce at the end of 1990 an inflation objective for the annual inflation rate for the year ending in December 1991. However, Chile was not regarded as a fully-fledged inflation targeter until October 1999. According to Pablo García Silva, member of the board of the Central Bank of Chile, this has allowed to attenuate inflation. García Silva exemplifies this with the limited inflation seen in Chile during the 2002 Brazilian general election and the Great Recession of 2008–2009.

==== Czech Republic ====
The Czech National Bank (CNB) is an example of an inflation targeting central bank in a small open economy with a recent history of economic transition and real convergence to its Western European peers. Since 2010 the CNB uses 2 percent with a +/- 1pp range around it as the inflation target. The CNB places a lot of emphasis on transparency and communication; indeed, a recent study of more than 100 central banks found the CNB to be among the four most transparent ones.

In 2012, inflation was expected to fall well below the target, leading the CNB to gradually reduce the level of its basic monetary policy instrument, the 2-week repo rate, until the zero lower bound (actually 0.05 percent) was reached in late 2012. In light of the threat of a further fall in inflation and possibly even of a protracted period of deflation, on 7 November 2013 the CNB declared an immediate commitment to weaken the exchange rate to the level of 27 Czech korunas per 1 euro (day-on-day weakening by about 5 percent) and to keep the exchange rate from getting stronger than this value until at least the end of 2014 (later on this was changed to the second half of 2016). The CNB thus decided to use the exchange rate as a supplementary tool to make sure that inflation returns to the 2 percent target level. Such a use of the exchange rate as tool within the regime of inflation targeting should not be confused with a fixed exchange-rate system or with a currency war.

=== United States ===
In a historic shift on 25 January 2012, U.S. Federal Reserve Chairman Ben Bernanke set a 2% target inflation rate, bringing the Fed in line with many of the world's other major central banks. Until then, the Fed's policy committee, the Federal Open Market Committee (FOMC), did not have an explicit inflation target but regularly announced a desired target range for inflation (usually between 1.7% and 2%) measured by the personal consumption expenditures price index.

Prior to adoption of the target, some people argued that an inflation target would give the Fed too little flexibility to stabilise growth and/or employment in the event of an external economic shock. Another criticism was that an explicit target might turn central bankers into what Mervyn King, former Governor of the Bank of England, had in 1997 colorfully termed "inflation nutters"—that is, central bankers who concentrate on the inflation target to the detriment of stable growth, employment, and/or exchange rates. King went on to help design the bank's inflation targeting policy, and asserts that the buffoonery has not actually happened, as did Chairman of the U.S. Federal Reserve Ben Bernanke, who stated in 2003 that all inflation targeting at the time was of a flexible variety, in theory and practice.

Former Chairman Alan Greenspan, as well as other former FOMC members such as Alan Blinder, typically agreed with the benefits of inflation targeting, but were reluctant to accept the loss of freedom involved; Bernanke, however, was a well-known advocate.

In August 2020, the FOMC released a revised Statement on Longer-Run Goals and Monetary Policy Strategy. The review announced the FED would seek to achieve inflation that 'averages' 2% over time. In practice this means that following periods when inflation has been running persistently below 2 percent, appropriate monetary policy will likely aim to achieve inflation moderately above 2 percent for some time. This way, the fed hopes to better anchor longer-term inflation expectations, which they say would foster price stability and moderate long-term interest rates and enhance the committee's ability to promote maximum employment in the face of significant economic disturbances.

== Theoretical questions ==
New classical macroeconomics and rational expectations hypothesis can explain how and why inflation targeting works. Expectations of firms (or the subjective probability distribution of outcomes) will be around the prediction of the theory itself (the objective probability distribution of those outcomes) for the same information set. So, rational agents expect the most probable outcome to emerge. However, there is limited success at specifying the relevant model, and the full and perfect knowledge of a given macroeconomic system can be regarded as a comfortable presumption at best. Knowledge of the relevant model is not feasible, even if high-level econometrical techniques were accessible or adequate identification of the relevant explanatory variables were performed. So, estimation bias depends on the quantity and quality of information to which the modeller has access. In other words, estimations are asymptotically unbiased with respect to the exploited information.

Meanwhile, consistency can be interpreted similarly. On the basis of asymptotical unbiasedness, a moderated version of the rational expectations hypothesis can be suggested in which familiarity with the theoretical parameters is not a requirement for the relevant model. An agent with access to sufficiently vast, quality information and high-level methodological skills could specify its own quasi-relevant model describing a specific macroeconomic system. By increasing the amount of information processed, this agent could further reduce its bias. If this agent were also focal, such as a central bank, then other agents would likely accept the proposed model and adjust their expectations accordingly. In this way, individual expectations become unbiased as much as possible, albeit against a background of considerable passivity. According to some researches, this is the theoretical background of the functionality of inflation targeting regimes.

== Empirical issues ==
=== Target band size ===
While most inflation targeting countries set their target band at 2 percentage points, the band sizes are wide-ranging across countries and inflation targeters frequently update their target bands. For instance, Australia has set an inflation target band between 2 percent and 3 percent, while South Africa has a target band of 3 percentage points between 3 percent and 6 percent. Data from Zhang's inflation targeting database reveal that the lower bounds of the inflation target bands have an average value of 2.3 percent and range between 0 and 9 percent, while the upper bounds have a mean of 4.7 percent and range between 2 and 11 percent. Historically, central banks have kept inflation within their target ranges for 44 percent of the time in a given year.

=== Track record ===
Inflation targeting countries' track records in maintaining inflation within the central banks' target bands differ substantially and financial markets differentiate inflation targeters by behaviors. Inflation targeting track records have varied and lasting impacts on asset prices such as stock returns, bond yields, and exchange rates. Consequently, credible inflation targeting countries enjoy enhanced monetary policy transmission and save fiscal space.

== Debate ==
There is some empirical evidence that inflation targeting does what its advocates claim, that is, making the outcomes, if not the process, of monetary policy more transparent. A 2021 study in the American Political Science Review found that independent central banks with rigid inflation targeting policies produce worse outcomes in banking crises than independent central banks whose policy mandate does not rigidly prioritize inflation.

=== Benefits ===
Inflation targeting allows monetary policy to "focus on domestic considerations and to respond to shocks to the domestic economy", which is not possible under a fixed exchange-rate system. Also, as a result of better inflation control and stability of economic growth, investors may more easily factor in likely interest rate changes into their investment decisions. Inflation expectations that are better anchored "allow monetary authorities to cut policy interest rates countercyclically".

Transparency is another key benefit of inflation targeting. Central banks in developed countries that have successfully implemented inflation targeting tend to "maintain regular channels of communication with the public". For example, the Bank of England pioneered the "Inflation Report" in 1993, which outlines the bank's "views about the past and future performance of inflation and monetary policy". Although it was not an inflation-targeting country until January 2012, up until then, the United States' "Statement on Longer-Run Goals and Monetary Policy Strategy" enumerated the benefits of clear communication—it "facilitates well-informed decisionmaking by households and businesses, reduces economic and financial uncertainty, increases the effectiveness of monetary policy, and enhances transparency and accountability, which are essential in a democratic society".

An explicit numerical inflation target increases a central bank's accountability, and thus it is less likely that the central bank falls prey to the time-inconsistency trap. This accountability is especially significant because even countries with weak institutions can build public support for an independent central bank. Institutional commitment can also insulate the bank from political pressure to undertake an overly expansionary monetary policy.

An econometric analysis found that although inflation targeting results in higher economic growth, it does not necessarily guarantee stability based on their study of 36 emerging economies from 1979 to 2009.

=== Shortcomings ===
Supporters of a nominal income target criticize the propensity of inflation targeting to neglect output shocks by focusing solely on the price level. Adherents of market monetarism, led by Scott Sumner, argue that in the United States, the Federal Reserve's mandate is to stabilize both output and the price level, and that consequently a nominal income target would better suit the Fed's mandate. Australian economist John Quiggin, who also endorses nominal income targeting, stated that it "would maintain or enhance the transparency associated with a system based on stated targets, while restoring the balance missing from a monetary policy based solely on the goal of price stability". Quiggin blamed the late-2000s recession on inflation targeting in an economic environment in which low inflation is a "drag on growth". In practice, many central banks conduct "flexible inflation targeting" where the central bank strives to keep inflation near the target except when such an effort would imply too much output volatility.

Quiggin also criticized former Fed Chair Alan Greenspan and former European Central Bank President Jean-Claude Trichet for "ignor[ing] or even applaud[ing] the unsustainable bubbles in speculative real estate that produced the crisis, and to react[ing] too slowly as the evidence emerged".

In a 2012 op-ed, University of Nottingham economist Mohammed Farhaan Iqbal suggested that inflation targeting "evidently passed away in September 2008", referencing the 2008 financial crisis. Frankel suggested "that central banks that had been relying on [inflation targeting] had not paid enough attention to asset-price bubbles", and also criticized inflation targeting for "inappropriate responses to supply shocks and terms-of-trade shocks". In turn, Iqbal suggested that nominal income targeting or product-price targeting would succeed inflation targeting as the dominant monetary policy regime. The debate continues and many observers expect that inflation targeting will continue to be the dominant monetary policy regime, perhaps after certain modifications.

Empirically, it is not so obvious that inflation targeteers have better inflation control. Some economists argue that better institutions increase a country's chances of successfully targeting inflation. John Williams, a high-ranking Federal Reserve official, concluded that "when gauged by the behavior of inflation since the crisis, inflation targeting delivered on its promise".

In an article written since the COVID-19 pandemic, critics have pointed out that the Bank of Canada’s inflation-targeting has had unintended consequences, with persistently low interest rates over the last 12 years fuelling an increase in home prices by encouraging borrowing; and contributing to wealth inequalities by supporting higher equity values.

== Inflation target ==
=== Positive ===
The typical numerical target of 2% has come under debate since the period of rapid inflation experienced during the COVID-19 pandemic. Mohamed El-Erian has suggested the Federal Reserve raise its inflation target to a (stable) 3% rate of inflation, saying "There's nothing scientific about 2%".

On November 18, 2026, Federal Reserve Governor Christopher Waller said some businesses were getting used to increasing prices by about 3% a year, even though the Fed aims to keep inflation at 2%.

Over time, the compound effect of small annual price increases will significantly reduce a currency's purchasing power. For example, successfully hitting a target of +2% each year for 40 years would cause the price of a $100 basket of goods to rise to $220.80. Cumulative inflation can impact the perception of inflation.

A study found higher inflation is correlated with and causes lower real GDP per capita.

=== Zero ===
The drawbacks of positive and negative inflation targets can be minimized by choosing a target of zero inflation on average.

=== Negative ===
Some economists argue that inflation is more likely than deflation to cause an economic contraction. Andrew Atkeson and Patrick J. Kehoe argued that deflation is the necessary consequence of optimal monetary policy or zero interest-rate policy. The zero lower bound problem can be mitigated with helicopter money.

=== Variations ===
In contrast to the usual inflation rate targeting, Laurence M. Ball proposed targeting long-run inflation using a monetary conditions index. In his proposal, the monetary conditions index is a weighted average of the interest rate and exchange rate. It will be easy to put many other things into this monetary conditions index.

In the "constrained discretion" framework, inflation targeting combines two contradicting monetary policies—a rule-based approach and a discretionary approach—as a precise numerical target is given for inflation in the medium term and a response to economic shocks in the short term. Some inflation targeters associate this with more economic stability.

== Countries ==
There were 27 countries regarded by the Bank of England's Centre for Central Banking Studies as fully fledged inflation targeters at the beginning of 2012. Other lists count 26 or 28 countries as of 2010. Since then, the United States and Japan have also adopted inflation targets although the Federal Reserve, like the European Central Bank, does not consider itself to be an inflation-targeting central bank.

Country	Central bank	Year adopted inflation targeting	Notes
New Zealand	Reserve Bank of New Zealand	12/1989	The pioneer; see Section 8: Reserve Bank of New Zealand Act of 1989.
Canada	Bank of Canada	02/1991	
United Kingdom	Bank of England	10/1992	First in Europe, although Germany had adopted many elements of inflation targeting earlier.
Sweden	Sveriges Riksbank	01/1993	The inflation target regime was announced in January 1993 and applied as of 1995. The Riksbank had practiced price-level targeting since abandonment of the gold standard in 1931.
Australia	Reserve Bank of Australia	06/1993	
Israel	Bank of Israel	06/1997	Informally since 1992. Fully fledged inflation targeting from June 1997.
Czech Republic	Czech National Bank	12/1997	First in Central and Eastern Europe.
Poland	National Bank of Poland	1998	
Brazil	Brazilian Central Bank	06/1999	
Chile	Central Bank of Chile	09/1999	At the end of 1990, a 20% inflation rate pushed the Central Bank of Chile to announce an inflation objective for the annual inflation rate for the year ending in December 1991.
Colombia	Banco de la República	10/1999	
South Africa	South African Reserve Bank	02/2000	
Thailand	Bank of Thailand	05/2000	
Hungary	Hungarian National Bank	06/2001	
Mexico	Bank of Mexico	2001	Some sources say 1999.
Norway	Norges Bank	03/2001	
Iceland	Central Bank of Iceland	03/2001	
Peru	Central Reserve Bank of Peru	01/2002	
Philippines	Bangko Sentral ng Pilipinas	01/2002	
Guatemala	Bank of Guatemala	01/2005	
Indonesia	Bank Indonesia	07/2005	
Romania	National Bank of Romania	08/2005	
Armenia, Republic of	Central Bank of Armenia	01/2006	
Turkey	Türkiye Cumhuriyet Merkez Bankası	01/2006	
Ghana	Bank of Ghana	05/2007	Informally in 2002, formally from May 2007.
Georgia	National Bank of Georgia	01/2009	
Serbia, Republic of	National Bank of Serbia	01/2009	
United States	Federal Reserve	01/2012	
Moldova, Republic of	National Bank of Moldova	12/2012	
Japan	Bank of Japan	01/2013	
Russian Federation	Central Bank of Russia	01/2014	
Republic of Kazakhstan	National Bank of Republic of Kazakhstan	08/2015	
Ukraine	National Bank of Ukraine	08/2015	Official document about implementation of inflation targeting in Ukraine
India	Reserve Bank of India	08/2016	Decision taken after India had ~10% inflation rate for around 5 years.
Argentina	Central Bank of Argentina	09/2016	Until September 2018, when the Central Bank changed its monetary policy to crawling peg.

In addition, South Korea (Bank of Korea) and Iceland (Central Bank of Iceland) and others.

== See also ==
- Cumulative process
- Demurrage currency
- Fisher equation
- Inflationism
- Inflation accounting
- Inflation derivative
- Inflation hedge
- List of countries by inflation rate
- Monetarism
- Nominal income target
- Output gap
- Phillips curve
- Time value of money
- Taylor rule
- Welfare cost of inflation
