= Scott Sumner =

American economist

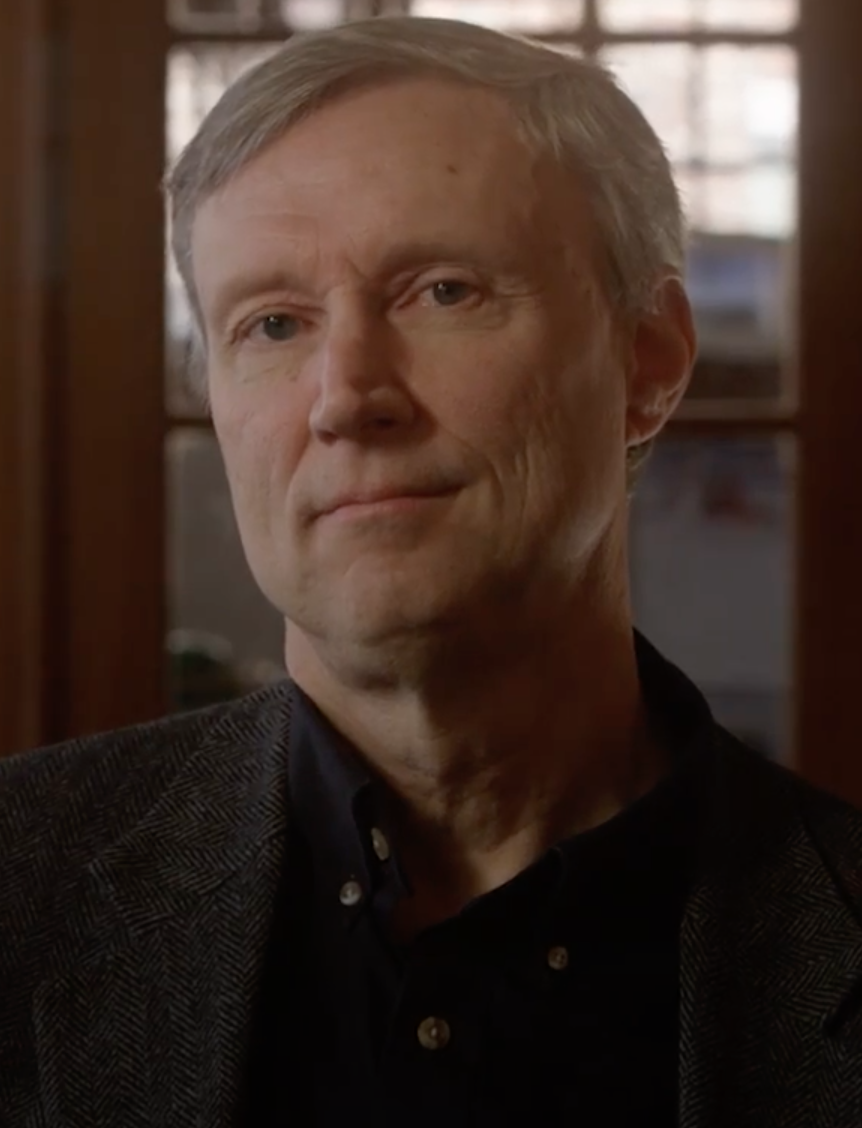
- Sumner in a 2016 video by the Mercatus Center
- Born: 1955 (age 70–71)

Academic background
- Education: University of Wisconsin (B.A.); University of Chicago (Ph.D.)
- Influences: Milton Friedman

Academic work
- Discipline: Monetary economics
- School or tradition: Market monetarism
- Institutions: Bentley University; Mercatus Center; Independent Institute
- Website: Information at IDEAS / RePEc

Scott B. Sumner (born 1955) is an American economist. He was previously the Director of the Program on Monetary Policy at the Mercatus Center at George Mason University, a Research Fellow at the Independent Institute, and a professor at Bentley University in Waltham, Massachusetts. His economics blog, The Money Illusion, popularized the idea of nominal GDP targeting, which says that the Federal Reserve and other central banks should target nominal GDP, real GDP growth plus the rate of inflation, to better "induce the correct level of business investment".

In May 2012, Chicago Fed President Charles L. Evans became the first sitting member of the Federal Open Market Committee (FOMC) to endorse the idea.

After Ben Bernanke's announcement of a new round of quantitative easing on September 13, 2012, which open-endedly committed the FOMC to purchase $40 billion agency mortgage-backed securities per month until the "labor market improves substantially", some media outlets began hailing him as the "blogger who saved the economy", for popularizing the concept of nominal income targeting.

== Academic career ==
Sumner received a PhD in economics from the University of Chicago in 1985. His published research focuses on prediction markets and monetary policy.

During the 2008 financial crisis, Sumner began authoring a blog where he vocally criticized the view that the United States economy was stuck in a liquidity trap. Sumner advocates that central banks such as the Federal Reserve create a futures market for the level of nominal gross domestic product (NGDP, also known as nominal income), and adjust monetary policy to achieve a nominal income target on the basis of information from the market. Monetary authorities generally choose to target other metrics, such as inflation, unemployment, the money supply or hybrids of these and rely on information from the financial markets, indices of unemployment or inflation, etc. to make monetary policy.

In 2015, Sumner published The Midas Paradox: A New Look at the Great Depression and Economic Instability. The book argued that the Depression was greatly extended by repeated gold market shocks and New Deal wage policies.

== Market monetarism ==
A school of economics known as market monetarism has coalesced around Sumner's views; The Daily Telegraph international business editor Ambrose Evans-Pritchard has referred to Sumner as the "eminence grise" of market monetarism. In 2012, the Chronicle of Higher Education referred to Sumner as "among the most influential" economist bloggers, along with Greg Mankiw of Harvard University and Paul Krugman of Princeton. In 2012, Foreign Policy ranked Sumner jointly with Federal Reserve chair Ben Bernanke 15th on its list of 100 top global thinkers.

== Nominal GDP targeting ==
Sumner contends that inflation is "measured inaccurately and does not discriminate between demand versus supply shocks" and that "Inflation often changes with a lag...but nominal GDP growth falls very, very quickly, so it'll give you a more timely signal stimulus is needed". He argued that monetary policy can offset austerity policies such as those pursued by the British government during the Great Recession.

In April 2011, the Reserve Bank of New Zealand responded to Sumner's critique of inflation targeting, arguing that a nominal GDP target would be too technically complicated, and make monetary policy difficult to communicate. By November 2011, however, economists from Goldman Sachs were advocating that the Federal Reserve adopt a nominal income target. Nathan Sheets, a former top official at the Federal Reserve and the head of international economics at Citigroup, proposed that the Federal Reserve adopt a nominal consumption target instead.

Sumner has argued that one cannot account for the impact of fiscal policy without first considering how monetary policy may affect the outcome; fiscal stimulus may not succeed if monetary policy is tightened in response. Economic journalists have referred to this as the Sumner Critique, akin to the Lucas critique. Summarizing this thinking, The Economist suggested that a growth rate of 5.3% would result in concerns over (future) inflation and tightening of monetary policy, largely because 5.3% is beyond both projections and goals of the Federal Reserve.

== Other views ==
Sumner has been described as a libertarian or classical liberal. Sumner has criticized populists like Jair Bolsonaro, Donald Trump, and Hungarian prime minister Viktor Orban, referring to them as the "new axis of evil".

Sumner is a vocal critic of Donald Trump, calling him "Putin's puppy", opining that he has a "contempt for democracy", while also comparing him to Adolf Hitler and Napoleon. Sumner described Trump as having a "longstanding infatuation" with Putin, citing a comment Trump made in which he called Putin "a leader far more than our president [Barack Obama]". Sumner has suggested that Trump secretly desires the dictatorial powers of the CCP.

Sumner has accused Tucker Carlson, Fox, and the Republican Party of spreading "misinformation" regarding vaccines, stating there is a "special circle" for doctors discouraging pregnant women from getting the vaccine.

Sumner has been critical of Robert F. Kennedy Jr. and the 2024 Make America Healthy Again movement, stating they were only seeking the "highest bidder".

== Personal life ==
Well known in Bentley's economics department as a "technophobe," Sumner, who purchased his first cell phone in 2011, apparently "triggered expressions of surprise and amusement when he informed his colleagues that he was starting a blog."

== Bibliography ==
=== Books ===
- Sumner, Scott B. (2023). Alternative Approaches to Monetary Policy (PDF).
- Sumner, Scott B. (2021). The Money Illusion: Market Monetarism, the Great Recession, and the Future of Monetary Policy. Chicago: University of Chicago Press. ISBN 978-0226773681.
- Sumner, Scott B. (2015). The Midas Paradox: A New Look at the Great Depression and Economic Instability. Independent Institute. ISBN 978-1-59813-150-5.
- Sumner, Scott B. (2015). "What Would Milton Friedman Have Thought of Market Monetarism?". In Cord, Robert A.; Hammond, J. Daniel (eds.). Milton Friedman: Contributions to Economics and Public Policy. Oxford University Press. pp. 246–264. ISBN 9780198704324.
- Sumner, Scott B. (2012). "5. How Nominal GDP Targeting Could Have Prevented the Crash of 2008". In Beckworth, David (ed.). Boom and Bust Banking: The Causes and Cures of the Great Recession. Independent Institute. pp. 129–165. ISBN 978-1-59813-076-8.

=== Articles ===
==== The Hill ====
- Sumner, Scott (November 25, 2021). "The politics of carbon taxes versus clean energy subsidies". The Hill. Capitol Hill Publishing Corporation.
- Sumner, Scott (July 8, 2021). "An economist's perspective on 'gain-of-function' virus research". The Hill. Capitol Hill Publishing Corporation.
- Sumner, Scott (April 29, 2021). "Should we worry about inflation? Not yet". The Hill. Capitol Hill Publishing Corporation.
- Sumner, Scott (February 17, 2021). "Beware the new price bubbles? Not so fast". The Hill. Capitol Hill Publishing Corporation.
- Sumner, Scott (January 6, 2021). "Lessons from the pandemic: Don't let the perfect be the enemy of the good". The Hill. Capitol Hill Publishing Corporation.
- Sumner, Scott (September 17, 2020). "New Fed approach takes inflation targeting more seriously". The Hill. Capitol Hill Publishing Corporation.
- Sumner, Scott (August 12, 2020). "Can the Fed reduce racial inequality?". The Hill. Capitol Hill Publishing Corporation.
- Sumner, Scott (January 15, 2020). "Trump's policies are increasing, not decreasing, the trade deficit". The Hill. Capitol Hill Publishing Corporation.
- Sumner, Scott (June 21, 2019). "Crafting monetary policy for the 21st century economy". The Hill. Capitol Hill Publishing Corporation.
- Sumner, Scott (April 10, 2019). "A better Modern Monetary Theory". The Hill. Capitol Hill Publishing Corporation.
- Sumner, Scott (February 23, 2019). "The Fed steers the ship, but we deserve to know where we're headed". The Hill. Capitol Hill Publishing Corporation.
- Sumner, Scott (January 25, 2019). "Tax-and-spend progressives put faith in flawed policy theory". The Hill. Capitol Hill Publishing Corporation.
- Sumner, Scott (October 7, 2018). "In search of real — not nominal — wage gains". The Hill. Capitol Hill Publishing Corporation.
- Sumner, Scott (August 19, 2018). "An even bigger China shock". The Hill. Capitol Hill Publishing Corporation.
- Sumner, Scott (July 2, 2018). "The Federal Reserve must modernize its approach". The Hill. Capitol Hill Publishing Corporation.
- Sumner, Scott (October 20, 2017). "Lessons from 'Black Monday': It's not easy to spot bubbles". The Hill. Capitol Hill Publishing Corporation.
- Sumner, Scott (February 14, 2017). "Three Recommendations for Monetary Policy Compromise". The Hill. Capitol Hill Publishing Corporation.

==== U.S. News & World Report ====
- Sumner, Scott (December 26, 2017). "Low Inflation Nation". U.S. News & World Report.
- Sumner, Scott (July 10, 2017). "Demystify the Fed". U.S. News & World Report.
- Sumner, Scott; Horan, Patrick (May 30, 2017). "Fed Up With Congress". U.S. News & World Report.

==== Mercatus Center ====
- Sumner, Scott (October 19, 2021). "The Princeton School and the Zero Lower Bound". Mercatus Center.
- Horan, Patrick; Sumner, Scott; Beckworth, David; Russo, Christopher M. (July 12, 2021). "What's Going On at the Federal Reserve?". Discourse. Mercatus Center.
- Sumner, Scott (November 23, 2020). "A Critique of Interest Rate–Oriented Monetary Economics". Mercatus Center.
- Sumner, Scott; Erdmann, Kevin (August 4, 2020). "Housing Policy, Monetary Policy, and the Great Recession". Mercatus Center.
- Sumner, Scott; Horan, Patrick (April 2, 2020). "Reforming the Fed's Toolkit and Quantitative Easing Practices: A Plan to Achieve Level Targeting". Mercatus Center.
- Sumner, Scott (February 18, 2020). "Currency Manipulation, Saving Manipulation, and the Current Account Balance". Mercatus Center.
- Sumner, Scott (February 18, 2020). "Currency Manipulation: Reframing the Debate". Mercatus Center.
- Sumner, Scott (September 12, 2019). "Should the Fed Pay Interest on Bank Reserves?". Mercatus Center.
- Sumner, Scott (August 27, 2019). "The Relationship between Interest Rates and Monetary Policy". Mercatus Center.
- Sumner, Scott (August 13, 2019). "How the Fed Controls Monetary Policy". Mercatus Center.
- Sumner, Scott (April 25, 2019). "Understanding the Federal Reserve". Mercatus Center.
- Sumner, Scott; Horan, Patrick (March 11, 2019). "How Reliable Is Modern Monetary Theory as a Guide to Policy?". Mercatus Center.
- Sumner, Scott (November 15, 2018). "How to Improve Fed Accountability and Transparency". Mercatus Center.
- Sumner, Scott (October 8, 2018). "How Prediction Markets Can Improve Monetary Policy: A Case Study". Mercatus Center.
- Sumner, Scott (July 2, 2018). "Explaining Quantitative Easing". Mercatus Center.
- Sumner, Scott; Roberts, Ethan (March 19, 2018). "The Promise of Nominal GDP Targeting". Mercatus Center.
- Sumner, Scott (September 11, 2013). "Why the Fiscal Multiplier is Roughly Zero". Mercatus Center.
- Sumner, Scott (July 24, 2013). "A Market-Driven Nominal GDP Targeting Regime". Mercatus Center.
- Sumner, Scott (October 23, 2012). "The Case for Nominal GDP Targeting". Mercatus Center.

==== Cato Institute ====
- Sumner, Scott (2016). "Nudging the Fed Toward a Rules-Based Policy Regime" (PDF). Cato Journal. 36 (2). Cato Institute: 315–335.
- Sumner, Scott B. (2014). "Nominal GDP Targeting: A Simple Rule to Improve Fed Performance" (PDF). Cato Journal. 34 (2). Cato Institute: 315–337.
- Sumner, Scott (December 2, 2013). "Central Banks Can and Do Hit Inflation Targets". Cato Unbound. Cato Institute.
- Sumner, Scott (November 25, 2013). "Asset Prices, Inflation, and Interest Rates". Cato Institute.
- Sumner, Scott (November 22, 2013). "The Fed Was a Mistake. But Now That We Have It…". Cato Institute.
- Sumner, Scott (November 8, 2013). "In Defense of a Flexible Monetary Policy". Cato Institute.
- Sumner, Scott (Fall 2011). "Re-Targeting the Fed". National Affairs (37). National Affairs, Inc.
- Sumner, Scott (October 1, 2009). "Final Thoughts and Thanks". Cato Unbound. Cato Institute.
- Sumner, Scott (September 30, 2009). "We Can't Agree on Everything, George…". Cato Unbound. Cato Institute.
- Sumner, Scott (September 29, 2009). "Defining the Stance of Monetary Policy Is Harder than It Looks". Cato Unbound. Cato Institute.
- Sumner, Scott (September 29, 2009). "Clearing up Some Miscommunication". Cato Unbound. Cato Institute.
- Sumner, Scott (September 28, 2009). "Score-Keeping with Selgin". Cato Unbound. Cato Institute.
- Sumner, Scott (September 25, 2009). "From Discretion to Futures Targeting, One Step at a Time". Cato Unbound. Cato Institute.
- Sumner, Scott (September 23, 2009). "Almost on the Money: Replies to Hamilton, Selgin, and Hummel". Cato Unbound. Cato Institute.
- Sumner, Scott (September 14, 2009). "The Real Problem was Nominal". Cato Unbound. Cato Institute.
- Sumner, Scott (2002). "Some Observations on the Return of the Liquidity Trap" (PDF). Cato Journal. 21 (3). Cato Institute: 481–490.

==== Others ====
- Sumner, Scott B. (March 28, 2018). "The problem with central bankers' inflation preoccupation". CapX. Centre for Policy Studies.
- Sumner, Scott B. (November 2, 2017). "Trump wants a non-economist to lead the Fed. That could be dangerous". The Washington Post. Nash Holdings.
- Sumner, Scott B. (2016). "The Fed and the Great Recession: How Better Monetary Policy Can Avert the Next Crisis". Foreign Affairs. Council on Foreign Relations.
- Sumner, Scott B. (May 13, 2016). "The Curious Rise of the Push for $15 Wage". Orange County Register. Digital First Media.
- Sumner, Scott B. (February 4, 2016). "Are Congress and the Fed Repeating the Mistakes of the Depression?". The Fiscal Times. The Fiscal Times Media Group.
- Sumner, Scott B. (December 4, 2015). "Translating 'Fedspeak' into English Shouldn't Be So Hard". American Banker. Arizent.
- Sumner, Scott B. (October 2015). "Milton Friedman Saw the Euro Crisis Coming". Reason. Reason Foundation.
- Sumner, Scott; Erdmann, Kevin (June 8, 2015). "Here's What's Driving Inequality". National Review.
- Sumner, Scott (March 2015). "What Would Milton Friedman Have Thought of the Great Recession?". The American Journal of Economics and Sociology. 74 (2). Wiley-Blackwell: 209–235. doi:10.1111/ajes.12097.
- Sumner, Scott B. (March 1, 2015). "Is It Fair to Tax Capital Gains at Lower Rates Than Earned Income?". The Wall Street Journal. News Corp.
- "Economists on the Welfare State and the Regulatory State: Why Don't Any Argue in Favor of One and Against the Other?" (PDF). Econ Journal Watch. 12 (1). Fraser Institute: 2–14.
- Sumner, Scott B. (August 6, 2013). "A new way to run the U.S. economy". Politico.
- Sumner, Scott; Jackson, Aaron L. (October 2006). "Velocity Futures Markets: Does the Fed Need A Structural Model?". Economic Inquiry. 44 (4). Wiley-Blackwell: 716–728. doi:10.1093/ei/cbj044.
- Sumner, Scott (2000). "Is Nonprice Competition in Currency Inefficient?". Journal of Money, Credit and Banking. 32 (1). Ohio State University Press: 146–149. doi:10.2307/2601097. JSTOR 2601097.
- Sumner, Scott; Gulley, O. David; Newman, Ross (1998). "Money demand and nominal debt: An equilibrium model of the liquidity effect". Journal of Macroeconomics. 20 (2). Elsevier: 267–293. doi:10.1016/S0164-0704(98)00057-3.
- Sumner, Scott (November 1997). "Reply to Garrison and White". Journal of Money, Credit and Banking. 29 (4). Ohio State University Press: 542–545. doi:10.2307/2953713. JSTOR 2953713.
- Sumner, Scott (February 1995). "The Impact of Futures Price Targeting on the Precision and Credibility of Monetary Policy". Journal of Money, Credit and Banking. 27 (1). Wiley-Blackwell: 89–106. doi:10.2307/2077852. JSTOR 2077852.
- Sumner, Scott; Silver, Stephen (January 1995). "Nominal and Real Wage Cyclicality during the Interwar Period". Southern Economic Journal. 61 (3). Southern Economic Association: 109–118. JSTOR 1060983.
- Sumner, Scott (October 1994). "A Note on the Viability of an 'Indirectly Convertible' Gold Standard". Southern Economic Journal. 61 (2). Southern Economic Association: 530–533. doi:10.2307/1059998. JSTOR 1059998.
- Sumner, Scott (March 1993). "Colonial Currency and the Quantity Theory of Money: A Critique of Smith's Interpretation". The Journal of Economic History. 53 (1). Cambridge University Press: 139–145. doi:10.1017/S0022050700012420. JSTOR 2123179. S2CID 155035369.
- Sumner, Scott (February 1993). "Privatizing the Mint". Journal of Money, Credit and Banking. 25 (1). Ohio State University Press: 13–29. doi:10.2307/2077817. JSTOR 2077817.
- Sumner, Scott (1992). "The Gold Standard, Monetary Policy, and the Banking School - Currency School Debate". Eastern Economic Journal. 18 (3). Palgrave Macmillan: 345–358. JSTOR 40325457.
- Sumner, Scott (February 1990). "The Forerunners of 'New Monetary Economics' Proposals to Stabilize the Unit of Account: Note". Journal of Money, Credit and Banking. 22 (1). Ohio State University Press: 109–118. doi:10.2307/1992131. JSTOR 1992131.
- Sumner, Scott; Grubaugh, Stephen (August 1989). "Commodity Prices, Money Surprises, and Fed Credibility: Comment". Journal of Money, Credit and Banking. 21 (3). Ohio State University Press: 407–408. doi:10.2307/1992424. JSTOR 1992424.
- Sumner, Scott; Silver, Stephen (June 1989). "Real Wages, Employment, and the Phillips Curve". Journal of Political Economy. 97 (3). University of Chicago Press: 706–720. doi:10.1086/261623. JSTOR 1830462. S2CID 154849270.

== See also ==
- Market monetarism
- Nominal income target
