= Liquidity trap =

Situation described in Keynesian economics

A liquidity trap is a situation, described in Keynesian economics, in which, "after the rate of interest has fallen to a certain level, liquidity preference may become virtually absolute in the sense that almost everyone prefers holding cash rather than holding a debt (financial instrument) which yields so low a rate of interest."

Negative natural interest rates and a zero lower bound are necessary conditions of a liquidity trap. Temporary economic disruption (e.g. banking crises, excessive debt accumulation) and structural factors (e.g. demographic decline, inequality) can produce negative natural interest rates. Credible monetary policy can overcome liquidity traps.

A liquidity trap is caused when people hold cash because they expect an adverse event such as deflation, insufficient aggregate demand, or war. Among the characteristics of a liquidity trap are interest rates that are close to zero lower bound and changes in the money supply that fail to translate into changes in inflation.

The Great Depression, the Great Recession and Japan's Lost Decades are examples of liquidity traps.

== Origin and definition of the term ==
John Maynard Keynes, in his 1936 General Theory, wrote the following:

There is the possibility...that, after the rate of interest has fallen to a certain level, liquidity-preference may become virtually absolute in the sense that almost everyone prefers cash to holding a debt which yields so low a rate of interest. In this event the monetary authority would have lost effective control over the rate of interest. But whilst this limiting case might become practically important in future, I know of no example of it hitherto.

This concept of monetary policy's potential impotence was further worked out in the works of British economist John Hicks, who published the IS–LM model representing Keynes's system. (Note: The model depicts and tracks the intersection of the "investment–saving" (IS) curve with the "liquidity preference–money supply" (LM) curve. At the intersection, according to the mainstream, Neo-Keynesian analysis, simultaneous equilibrium occurs in both interest and financial-assets markets) Nobel laureate Paul Krugman, in his work on monetary policy, follows the formulations of Hicks: (Note: Hicks, subsequently and a few years before his passing, repudiated the IS/LM model, describing it as an "impoverished" representation of Keynesian economics. See Hicks (1981))

A liquidity trap may be defined as a situation in which conventional monetary policies have become impotent, because nominal interest rates are at or near zero: injecting monetary base into the economy has no effect, because [monetary] base and bonds are viewed by the private sector as perfect substitutes.

In a liquidity trap, people are indifferent between bonds and cash because the rates of interest both financial instruments provide to their holder is practically equal: The interest on cash is zero and the interest on bonds is near-zero. Hence, the central bank cannot affect the interest rate any more (through augmenting the monetary base) and has lost control over it.

In Keynes' description of a liquidity trap, people simply do not want to hold bonds and prefer other, more-liquid forms of money instead. Because of this preference, after converting bonds into cash, (Note: Whereby "cash" includes both currency and bank accounts, aka M1) this causes an incidental but significant decrease to the bonds' prices and a subsequent increase to their yields. However, people prefer cash no matter how high these yields are or how high the central bank sets the bond's rates (yields).

Post-Keynesian economist Hyman Minsky posited that "after a debt deflation that induces a deep depression, an increase in the money supply with a fixed head count of other [financial] assets may not lead to a rise in the price of other assets." This naturally causes interest rates on assets that are not considered "almost perfectly liquid" to rise. In which case, as Minsky had stated elsewhere,

The view that the liquidity-preference function is a demand-for-money relation permits the introduction of the idea that in appropriate circumstances the demand for money may be infinitely elastic with respect to variations in the interest rate… The liquidity trap presumably dominates in the immediate aftermath of a recession or financial crisis.

== Historical debate ==
Liquidity trap visualized in the context of the IS–LM model: A monetary expansion (the shift from LM to LM') has no effect on equilibrium interest rates or output. However, fiscal expansion (the shift from IS to IS") leads to a higher level of output (from Y* to Y") with no change in interest rates. And, ostensibly, since interest rates are unchanged, there is no crowding out effect either.

In the wake of the Keynesian Revolution in the 1930s and 1940s, various neoclassical economists sought to minimize the effect of liquidity-trap conditions. Don Patinkin and Lloyd Metzler invoked the existence of the so-called "Pigou effect", in which the stock of real money balances is ostensibly an argument of the aggregate demand function for goods, so that the money stock would directly affect the "investment saving" curve in IS/LM analysis. Monetary policy would thus be able to stimulate the economy even when there is a liquidity trap.

Monetarists, most notably Milton Friedman, Anna Schwartz, Karl Brunner, Allan Meltzer and others, strongly condemned any notion of a "trap" that did not feature an environment of a zero, or near-zero, interest rate across the whole spectrum of interest rates, i.e. both short- and long-term debt of the government and the private sector. In their view, any interest rate different from zero along the yield curve is a sufficient condition to eliminate the possibility of the presence of a liquidity trap. (Note: See "Monetarism and the liquidity trap)

In recent times, when the Japanese economy fell into a period of prolonged stagnation, despite near-zero interest rates, the concept of a liquidity trap returned to prominence. Keynes's formulation of a liquidity trap refers to the existence of a horizontal demand-curve for money at some positive level of interest rates; yet, the liquidity trap invoked in the 1990s referred merely to the presence of zero or near-zero interest-rates policies (ZIRP), the assertion being that interest rates could not fall below zero. (Note: The assumption being that no one would lend 100 dollars unless they were to get at least 100 dollars back, although we have seen in the 21st century the introduction, without any problem in demand, of negative interest-rates. See e.g. "Why negative interest rates sometimes succeed" by Gemma Tetlow, Financial Times, 5 September 2016) Some economists, such as Nicholas Crafts, have suggested a policy of inflation-targeting (by a central bank that is independent of the government) at times of prolonged, very low, nominal interest-rates, in order to avoid a liquidity trap or escape from it.

Some Austrian School economists, such as those of the Ludwig von Mises Institute, reject Keynes' theory of liquidity preference altogether. They argue that lack of domestic investment during periods of low interest-rates is the result of previous malinvestment and time preferences rather than liquidity preference. Chicago school economists remain critical of the notion of liquidity traps.

Keynesian economists, like Brad DeLong and Simon Wren-Lewis, maintain that the economy continues to operate within the IS-LM model, albeit an "updated" one, and the rules have "simply changed."

=== 2008 financial crisis ===
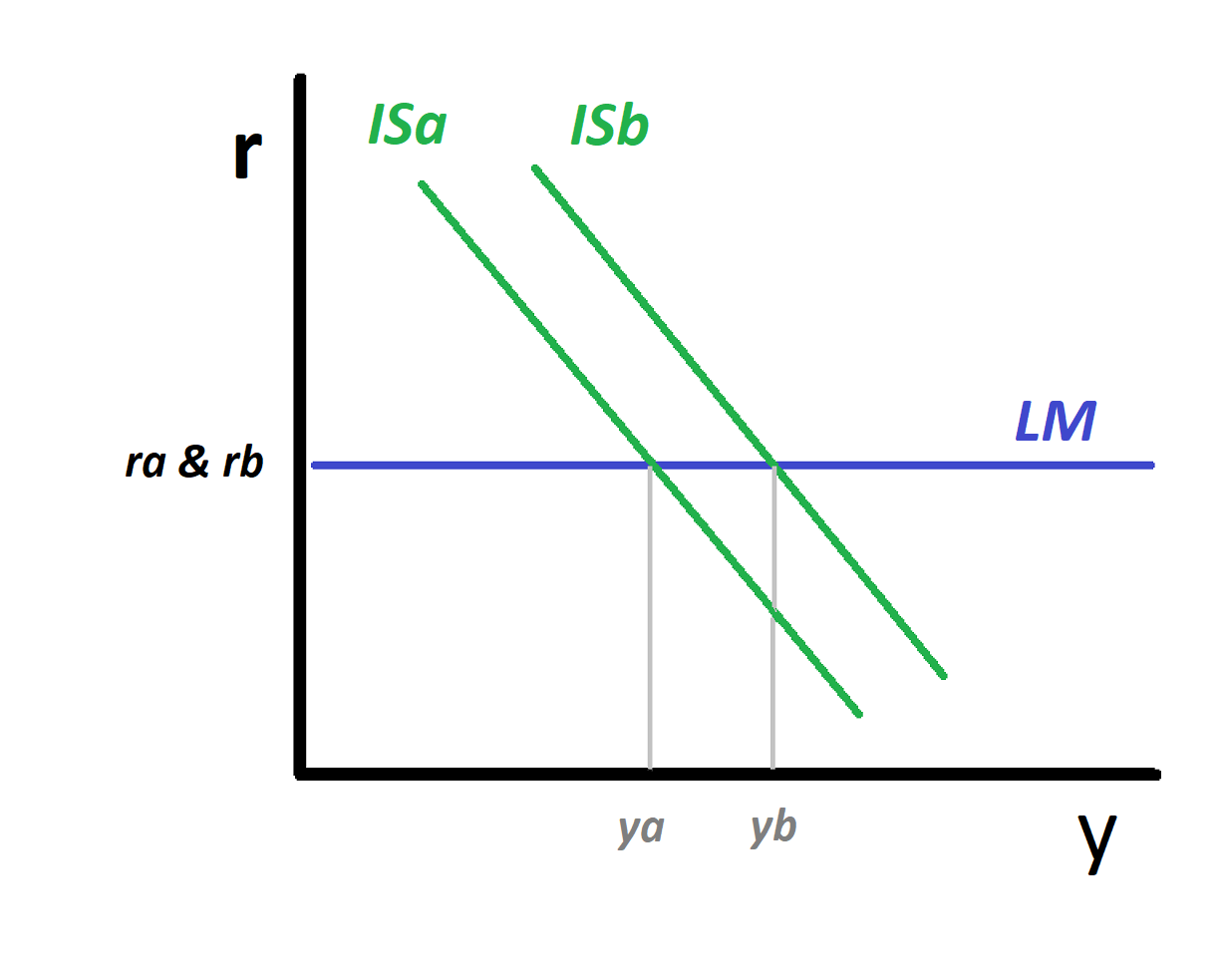
The IS-LM model modified for endogenous money: The central bank controls interest rates but not the money supply. The LM curve is now flat, since, when the money supply increases, the interest rate r does not move. Income Y increases from ya to yb without any rise in interest rates.

During the 2008 financial crisis, as short-term interest rates for the various central banks in the United States and Europe moved close to zero, economists such as Paul Krugman argued that much of the developed world, including the United States, Europe, and Japan, was in a liquidity trap. He noted that tripling of the monetary base in the US between 2008 and 2011 failed to produce any significant effect on domestic price indices or dollar-denominated commodity prices, a notion supported by others, such as Scott Sumner.

U.S. Federal Reserve economists assert that the liquidity trap can explain low inflation in periods of vastly increased central bank money supply. Based on experience $3.5 trillion of quantitative easing from 2009–2013, the hypothesis is that investors hoard and do not spend the increased money because the opportunity cost of holding cash (namely the interest forgone) is zero when the nominal interest rate is zero. This hoarding effect is purported to have reduced consequential inflation to half of what would be expected directly from the increase in the money supply, based on statistics from the expansive years. They further assert that the liquidity trap is possible only when the economy is in deep recession.

=== COVID-19 recession ===
Modest inflation during the COVID-19 crisis in 2020, despite unprecedented monetary stimulus and expansion, was similarly ascribed to hoarding of cash.

Post-Keynesians respond that the confusion by "mainstream economists" between conditions of a liquidity trap, as defined by Keynes and in the Post-Keynesian framework, and conditions of near-zero or zero interest rates, is intentional and ideologically motivated in ostensibly attempting to support monetary over fiscal policies. They argue that, quantitative easing programs in the United States, and elsewhere, caused the prices of financial assets to rise across the board and interest rates to fall; yet, a liquidity trap cannot exist, according to the Keynesian definition, unless the prices on imperfectly safe financial assets are falling and their interest rates are rising. The rise in the monetary base did not affect interest rates or commodity prices.

Taking the precedent of the 2008 financial crisis, critics of the mainstream definition of a liquidity trap point out that the central bank of the United States never, effectively, lost control of the interest rate. Whereas the United States did experience a liquidity trap in the period 2009/10, i.e. in "the immediate aftermath" of the crisis, (Note: During approximately 2009/10, the interest rates on risky financial assets failed to respond to Fed intervention, as demonstrated by the TED spread history. See TED rate for the period 2007/16) the critics of the mainstream definition claim that, after that period, there is no more of any kind of a liquidity trap since government and private-sector bonds are "very much in demand". This goes against Keynes' point as Keynes stated that "almost everyone prefers cash to holding a debt." However, modern finance has the concept of cash and cash equivalents; Treasuries may in some cases be treated as cash equivalents and not "debt" for liquidity purposes.

== See also ==
- Inflation targeting
- Inverted yield curve
- Helicopter money
- Productivity
- Return on investment
- Speculative bubble
- Subprime mortgage crisis
- Too big to fail
- Zero interest rate policy
