= David Glasner =

American economist

David Glasner is an American economist who currently works at the Federal Trade Commission.

Glasner received his entire education at the University of California, Los Angeles (UCLA), from which he received a BA in economics in 1970, MA in 1973 and PhD in 1977. Glasner's research interests include monetary theory, law and economics, and history of economic thought. He defends an "undogmatic version of liberalism against the more extreme versions of libertarianism on the one hand and socialism and nationalistic or statist forms of conservatism on the other." Since July 2011 Glasner maintains a blog called Uneasy Money, which is subtitled, "Commentary on monetary policy in the spirit of R. G. Hawtrey."

== Publications ==
Glasner's notable publications include:

=== Books ===
- Politics, Prices, and Petroleum (Ballinger/Pacific Institute, 1985)
- Free Banking and Monetary Reform (Cambridge University Press, 1988)

=== Chapters ===
- "An Evolutionary Theory of the State Monopoly over Money" in Money and the Nation State: The Financial Revolution, Government, and the World Monetary System, edited by Kevin Dowd and Richard Timberlake (Transaction Publishers, 1998)

=== Articles ===
- "The real-bills doctrine in the light of the law of reflux", History of Political Economy, 1992
- "A reinterpretation of classical monetary theory", Southern Economic Journal, 1985
