= Austan Goolsbee =

American economist (born 1969)

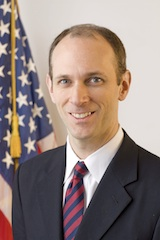
- Official portrait, 2011

President of the Federal Reserve Bank of Chicago
- Incumbent
- Assumed office January 9, 2023
- Preceded by: Charles L. Evans

26th Chair of the Council of Economic Advisers
- In office September 10, 2010 – August 5, 2011
- President: Barack Obama
- Preceded by: Christina Romer
- Succeeded by: Alan Krueger

Personal details
- Born: Austan Dean Goolsbee; August 18, 1969 (age 57) Waco, Texas, U.S.
- Spouse: Robin Winters (m. 1997)
- Children: 3
- Education: Yale University (BA, MA); Massachusetts Institute of Technology (PhD)

Austan Dean Goolsbee (born August 18, 1969) is an American economist. He is the president of the Federal Reserve Bank of Chicago and the Robert P. Gwinn Professor of Economics at the University of Chicago's Booth School of Business. He was the chairman of the Council of Economic Advisers from 2010 to 2011 and a member of President Barack Obama's cabinet. He served as a member of the Chicago Board of Education from 2018 to 2019.

Goolsbee was a member of the Council of Economic Advisers before becoming chair. He was also the Chief economist and chief-of-staff to Paul Volcker at the President's Economic Recovery Advisory Board—the board was formed during the 2008 financial crisis.

== Early life and education ==
Goolsbee was born in Waco, Texas, the son of Linda Catherine (née Dean) and the late Arthur Leon Goolsbee, a former executive of Utility Trailer Manufacturing Company. He was raised primarily in Whittier, California.

He graduated from Milton Academy and received both his B.A., summa cum laude, and M.A. in economics from Yale University in 1991. Goolsbee also was a member of the Skull and Bones secret society there. He went on to receive his Ph.D. in economics at the Massachusetts Institute of Technology in 1995.

He was named an Alfred P. Sloan Fellow (2000–02) and Fulbright Scholar (2006–07).

== Academia ==
Goolsbee has been a research fellow at the American Bar Foundation; research associate at the National Bureau of Economic Research in Cambridge, Massachusetts; and a member of the Panel of Economic Advisors to the Congressional Budget Office. He was previously named a Senior Economist to the Progressive Policy Institute (PPI) and a Distinguished Senior Fellow at the Center for American Progress.

Goolsbee's academic research is empirical and focuses on the Internet, productivity, taxes and government policy, and inflation. He and co-author Pete Klenow of Stanford University helped develop the Adobe Digital Price Index, a comprehensive measure of online inflation.

Goolsbee taught MBA classes on microeconomics, platform competition, economics and policy in the telecom, media and technology industries and economic policy (jointly with Raghuram Rajan) and Ph.D. classes in public economics and was an award-winning teacher with the leading business school news site Poets & Quants naming him one of the 'World's 50 Best Business School Professors'.

Goolsbee was also a journalist while serving as an academic. Goolsbee is the former host of the television show History's Business on the History Channel. In April 2006, Goolsbee began writing for the Economic Scene column in The New York Times. This column was later moved to Sundays and renamed the Economic View. Prior to this, he wrote the "Dismal Science" column for Slate.com, for which he won the 2006 Peter Lisagor Award for Exemplary Journalism. He has published papers in various peer-reviewed journals and books.

== Public service ==
=== Federal Reserve Bank of Chicago ===
Goolsbee was announced to be the 10th President and CEO of the Federal Reserve Bank of Chicago on December 1, 2022. He assumed office on January 9, 2023.

He expressed that one important goal for his presidency was to be more involved with the regional economy of the 7th District where he traveled extensively upon taking office.

Goolsbee was early in arguing that the unusual conditions in 2023 could enable an unusual outcome for the Macroeconomy, where inflation would fall dramatically but without causing a major recession. He called this the 'Golden Path' and acknowledged that such an outcome would be without historical precedent but that he believed it was possible because of favorable supply-side developments at this time coupled with the Fed's credibility having kept inflation expectations from rising.

=== Service in Obama administration ===
Goolsbee was nominated by President Obama to serve on the Council of Economic Advisers. Goolsbee was confirmed by the Senate on March 10, 2009. He was designated chair of the Council on September 10, 2010, succeeding Christina Romer. He concurrently served as chief economist and chief of staff at the Economic Recovery Advisory Board chaired by Paul Volcker. Goolsbee called Volcker his great mentor and one of his personal heroes. He joked that his life's goal was to try to be 80% Paul Volcker and 20% Muhammad Ali.

In these roles, Goolsbee acted as a frequent media surrogate for the Obama administration. He also starred in the White House Whiteboards which aimed to explain administration policy in an accessible way. A New York Times article about the series reported "praise for Mr. Goolsbee’s performance from journalists at Politico, The Wall Street Journal, The Economist and other outlets".

Outside of the standard political news shows, Goolsbee was a frequent guest on comedy shows, as well. He was interviewed by Jon Stewart for The Daily Show on August 11, 2009; February 1, 2010; October 25, 2010; February 24, 2011; August 3, 2011; and September 6, 2012.

He also appeared in Daily Show segments on November 11, 2009, where he was interviewed by Josh Gad about whether the Cash for Clunkers program had ruined demolition derby. On an episode airing on March 17, 2009, he stated that executives at American International Group (AIG) deserved the "Nobel Prize for Evil" for their role in the 2008 financial crisis. Jon Stewart described him as "Eliot Ness meets Milton Friedman".

On June 15, 2009, he appeared as a guest on The Colbert Report. He made a second appearance on The Colbert Report on October 13, 2010, and a third on May 18, 2011.

In 2009, he was called "Washington's funniest celebrity". One practical joke was giving a dead fish to the departing White House chief of staff Rahm Emanuel, who had been known to give dead fish to political opponents.

In January 2011, Goolsbee expressed the administration's confidence that the U.S. debt limit would be raised, noting that rhetoric from some members of Congress, who suggested the routine increase should be opposed, "[appear] to reflect a deep misunderstanding of the consequences of default".

On June 6, 2011, Goolsbee announced that he would return to the University of Chicago. He was expected to play an informal role from Chicago in Obama's 2012 campaign.

=== Campaign advising ===
He advised President Obama during his 2004 U.S. Senate race and was senior economic policy adviser during the 2008 Obama presidential campaign.

In 2019, he endorsed Pete Buttigieg during the Democratic Party presidential primary.

In the 2020 general election, he co-chaired the Economic Advisory Council for Joe Biden's presidential campaign.

== Recognition ==
In 2026, Chicago magazine ranked Goolsbee third on its list of the 50 most powerful Chicagoans, up from seventh in 2024.

In past years, Goolsbee was named one of the 100 Global Leaders for Tomorrow by the World Economic Forum in Switzerland, one of the six "Gurus of the Future" by the Financial Times, one of the 40 Under 40 by Crain's Chicago Business, and one of the 30 Under 30 by the Chicago Sun-Times.

He topped The New Yorker's list of the Ten Most Intriguing Political Personalities of 2010. Salon.com named him to its list of the 15 Sexiest Men of 2010. To this he remarked on NPR's quiz show Wait Wait...Don't Tell Me, "I didn't even know Salon was printed in Braille."

Additionally, the National Speech and Debate Association (formerly National Forensic League) recognized Goolsbee, the former national champion in extemporaneous speaking, as the 2011 Communicator of the Year. He was a successful debater in college. He and his partner David Gray were the National Team of the Year in 1991, defeating future senator Ted Cruz and his partner for the honor.

Press profiles of him include those done by The New York Times, NPR, George Will, the Financial Times, Reuters TV, the Chicago Tribune, Crain's Chicago Business, and Politico.

== Personal life ==
Goolsbee married Robin Winters on November 1, 1997. She was a management consultant with McKinsey & Company at the time and earlier the director of business development at MTV International.

Political offices
Preceded by Christina Romer	Chair of the Council of Economic Advisers; 2010–2011	Succeeded by Alan Krueger
Other offices
Preceded by Charles L. Evans	President of the Federal Reserve Bank of Chicago; 2023–present	Incumbent
