= Shock (economics) =

Unexpected event that affects an economy

In economics, a shock is an unexpected or unpredictable event that affects an economy, either positively or negatively. Technically, it is an unpredictable change in exogenous factors—that is, factors unexplained by an economic model—which may influence endogenous economic variables.

The response of economic variables, such as GDP and employment, at the time of the shock and at subsequent times, is measured by an impulse response function.

== Types of shocks ==
A technology shock is the kind resulting from a technological development that affects productivity.

If the shock is due to constrained supply, it is termed a supply shock and usually results in price increases for a particular product. Supply shocks can be produced when accidents or disasters occur. The 2008 Western Australian gas crisis resulting from a pipeline explosion at Varanus Island is one example.

A demand shock is a sudden change of the pattern of private expenditure, especially of consumption spending by consumers or of investment spending by businesses.

A preference shock is a change in preferences over consumption or leisure.

An inflationary shock happens when prices of commodities increase suddenly (e.g., after a decrease of government subsidies) while not all salaries are adjusted immediately throughout society (this results in a temporary loss of purchasing power for many consumers); or that production costs begin to exceed corporate revenues (e.g. following energy price hikes).

A monetary policy shock occurs when a central bank changes, without sufficient advance warning, its pattern of interest rate or money supply control. A fiscal policy shock is an unexpected change of government spending or taxation amounts.

Stock exchanges in the wake of the September 11 attacks. After the initial panic, the DJIA increased quickly for only a slight net decrease.

A news shock is a change in current expectations of future technological progress, which could be induced by new information about potential technological developments.

In the context of microeconomics, shocks are also studied at the household level, such as health, income, and consumption shocks. Negative individual and household economic shocks can result from job loss, for example, while positive shocks can come from winning the lottery. For example, in development microeconomics the relationship between household income shocks and household levels of consumption is studied to understand a household's ability to insure itself (testing the full-insurance hypothesis).

== Political impact ==
Economic shocks impact political preference. The experience of negative shocks such as job loss causes individuals to favor redistributive policies and broader social policies. Some evidence shows that negative economic shocks cause individuals to lose faith in political systems, though this erosion of trust is often temporary, rebounding over time. A narrow portion of voters may change their voting patterns in response to shocks, which can include support for candidates and policies that are antiestablishment, populist, leftist, or ceasing to participate in the electoral process. Positive economic shocks are linked to an increase in trust in government institutions.

== See also ==
- 1973 oil crisis
- Dynamic stochastic general equilibrium
- Shock therapy
- Social risk management
- Technology shock
- Vector autoregression
