= Michael H. Moskow =

Economist, 8th President of Federal Reserve Bank of Chicago

Michael Moskow
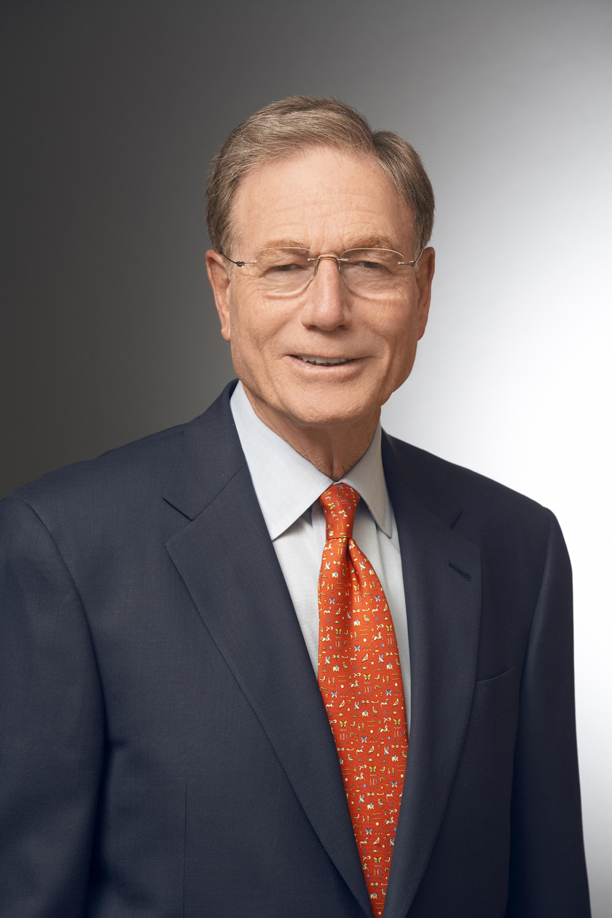

President of the Federal Reserve Bank of Chicago
- In office September 1, 1994 – August 31, 2007
- Preceded by: Silas Keehn
- Succeeded by: Charles L. Evans

20th Under Secretary of Labor
- In office 1976–1977
- Preceded by: Robert O. Anders
- Succeeded by: Robert J. Brown

Personal details
- Born: January 7, 1938 (age 88) Paterson, New Jersey, U.S.
- Spouse: Suzanne Kopp
- Education: Lafayette College (BA); University of Pennsylvania (MA, PhD)

Michael H. Moskow (born January 7, 1938) is currently vice chairman and distinguished fellow on the global economy at the Chicago Council on Global Affairs. From 1994 to 2007, he served as president and chief executive officer of the Federal Reserve Bank of Chicago. In that capacity, he was a member of the Federal Open Market Committee, the Federal Reserve System's most important monetary policy-making body.

Moskow's professional accomplishments include service in both the public and private sectors, as well as higher education. During the course of his career, he has been confirmed by the U.S. Senate for five positions in the federal government.

== Early career and government service ==
Moskow began his career teaching economics, labor relations, and management at Temple University, Lafayette College, and Drexel University. From 1969 to 1977, he held a number of senior positions in the federal government, including Deputy Secretary at the U.S. Department of Labor, director of the Council on Wage and Price Stability, Assistant Secretary for Policy Development and Research at the U.S. Department of Housing and Urban Development, and senior staff economist with the Council of Economic Advisers.

== Professional leadership and public service ==
In 1977, Moskow joined the private sector at Esmark in Chicago and later held senior management positions at Northwest Industries, Dart & Kraft, and Premark International. In 1991, President George H. W. Bush appointed Moskow Deputy U.S. Trade Representative, with the corresponding rank of Ambassador. In this role, he was responsible for trade negotiations with Japan, China, and Southeast Asian countries, as well as oversight of industries such as steel, semiconductors, and aircraft. Moskow returned to academia in 1993, joining the faculty of the Kellogg School of Management at Northwestern University where he was professor of strategy and international management at the time of his appointment as president of the Federal Reserve Bank of Chicago.

== Nonprofit and civic leadership ==
Moskow is active in numerous professional and civic organizations. He is chairman of the Japan America Society of Chicago, former chairman of the Economic Club of Chicago, and serves as a director of World Business Chicago. He is a board member and former chairman of the National Bureau of Economic Research, a member of the Commercial Club of Chicago, and a fellow of the National Academy of Public Administration. Moskow is also an emeritus trustee of Lafayette College.

== Corporate board memberships ==
Since leaving his position at the Federal Reserve, Moskow joined the boards of directors of Discover Financial Services, Commonwealth Edison (a subsidiary of Exelon), the National Futures Association, Northern Funds (2008–2013), Taylor Capital Group (2008–2014), and Diamond Management & Technology Consultants (2008–2010). He is a member of the advisory boards to the Chicago Mercantile Exchange, Edgewater Funds, and Promontory Financial Group.

== Family life and education ==
Moskow was born in Paterson, New Jersey. He received an A.B. in economics from Lafayette College in Easton, Pennsylvania, where he was a member of the Pi Lambda Phi fraternity, and a Ph.D. in business and applied economics from the University of Pennsylvania. He has received honorary doctoral degrees from DePaul University, Dominican University, Lafayette College, and Lewis University. Moskow is married to Suzanne Kopp-Moskow. He has three children from a previous marriage and seven grandchildren.

Other offices
Preceded by Silas Keehn	President of the Federal Reserve Bank of Chicago; 1994–2007	Succeeded by Charles L. Evans
