= Monetary conditions index =

Macroeconomic index number relevant for monetary policy

In macroeconomics, a monetary conditions index (MCI) is an index number calculated from a linear combination of a small number of economy-wide financial variables deemed relevant for monetary policy. These variables always include a short-run interest rate and an exchange rate.

An MCI may also serve as a day-to-day operating target for the conduct of monetary policy, especially in small open economies.

== History ==
The Central banks compute MCIs, with the Bank of Canada being the first to do so, beginning in the early 1990s.

== Calculation ==
The MCI begins with a simple model of the determinants of aggregate demand in an open economy, which include variables such as the real exchange rate as well as the real interest rate. Moreover, monetary policy is assumed to have a significant effect on these variables, especially in the short run. Hence a linear combination of these variables can measure the effect of monetary policy on aggregate demand. Since the MCI is a function of the real exchange rate, the MCI is influenced by events such as terms of trade shocks, and changes in business and consumer confidence, which do not necessarily affect interest rates.

Let aggregate demand take the following simple form:

$$\ y = a_0 + a_{1}r + a_{2}q + \nu ,$$

Where:

y = aggregate demand, logged;
r = real interest rate, measured in percents, not decimal fractions;
q = real exchange rate, defined as the foreign currency price of a unit of domestic currency. A rise in q means that the domestic currency appreciates. q is the natural log of an index number that is set to 1 in the base period (numbered 0 by convention);
ν = stochastic error term assumed to capture all other influences on aggregate demand.

a_{1} and a_{2} are the respective real interest rate and real exchange rate elasticities of aggregate demand. Empirically, we expect both a_{1} and a_{2} to be negative, and 0 ≤ a_{1}/a_{2} ≤ 1.

Let MCI_{0} be the (arbitrary) value of the MCI in the base year. The MCI is then defined as:

$$\ MCI_t = MCI_{0}exp[(r_t - r_0) + (a_{2}/a_{1})q_t].$$

Hence MCI_{t} is a weighted sum of the changes between periods 0 and t in the real interest and exchange rates. Only changes in the MCI, and not its numerical value, are meaningful, as is always the case with index numbers. Changes in the MCI reflect changes in monetary conditions between two points in time. A rise (fall) in the MCI means that monetary conditions have tightened (eased).

Because an MCI begins with a linear combination, infinitely many distinct pairs of interest rates, r, and exchange rates, q, yield the same value of the MCI. Hence r and q can move a great deal, with little or no effect on the value of the MCI. Nevertheless, the differing value of r and q consistent with a given value of MCI may have widely differing implications for real output and the inflation rate, especially if the time lags in the transmission of monetary policy are material. Since a_{1} and a_{2} are expected to have the same sign, r and q may move in opposite directions with little or no change in the MCI. Hence an MCI that changes little after an announced change in monetary policy is evidence that financial markets view the policy change as lacking credibility.

The real interest rate and real exchange rate require a measure of the price level, often calculated only quarterly and never more often than monthly. Hence calculating the MCI more often than monthly would not be meaningful. In practice, the MCI is calculated using the nominal exchange rate and a nominal short-run interest rate, for which data are readily available. This nominal variant of the MCI is very easy to compute in real time, even minute by minute, and assuming low and stable inflation, is not inconsistent with the underlying model of aggregate demand.
