= Technology shock =

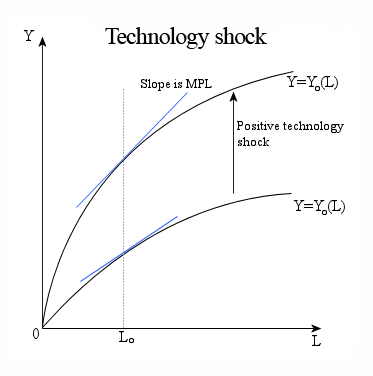
An example of the function, where Y=output, L=labor, MPL=marginal product of labor. The technology shock increases the output given the same level of, in this case, labor. The marginal product of labor is higher after the positive technology shock, this can be seen in the MPL (blue) line being steeper.

Technology shocks are sudden changes in technology that significantly affect economic, social, political or other outcomes. In economics, the term technology shock usually refers to events in a macroeconomic model, that change the production function. Usually this is modeled with an aggregate production function that has a scaling factor.

Normally reference is made to positive (i.e., productivity enhancing) technological changes, though technology shocks can also be contractionary. The term “shock” connotes the fact that technological progress is not always gradual – there can be large-scale discontinuous changes that significantly alter production methods and outputs in an industry, or in the economy as a whole. Such a technology shock can occur in many different ways. For example, it may be the result of advances in science that enable new trajectories of innovation, or may result when an existing technological alternative improves to a point that it overtakes the dominant design, or is transplanted to a new domain. It can also occur as the result of a shock in another system, such as when a change in input prices dramatically changes the price/performance relationship for a technology, or when a change in the regulatory environment significantly alters the technologies permitted (or demanded) in the market. Numerous studies have shown that technology shocks can have a significant effect on investment, economic growth, labor productivity, collaboration patterns, and innovation.

== Positive technology shock ==
The Industrial Revolution is an example of a positive technology shock. The Industrial Revolution occurred between the 18th and the 19th centuries where major changes in agriculture, manufacturing, mining, transport, and technology occurred.

What this did to the economy at the time was notable. It increased wages steadily over the period of time and it also increased population because people had the wages for standard living. This is an example of a positive technology shock, where it increases national and disposable income, and also increases the labor force. The Industrial Revolution also provided a much more efficient way to produce goods which lead to less labor-intensive work.

The rise of the internet, which coincided with rapid innovation in related networking equipment and software, also caused a major shock to the economy. The internet was a “general-purpose technology” with the potential to transform information dissemination on a massive scale. The shock created both great opportunity and great uncertainty for firms, precipitating large increases in alliance activity and an increase in innovation across a wide range of sectors.

== Negative technology shock ==
The oil shocks that occurred in the late 1970s are examples of negative technology shocks. When the oil shocks occurred, the energy that was used to extract to oil became more expensive, the energy was the technology in this case. The price of the capital and the labor both went up due to this shock, and this is an example of a negative technology shock.

== More examples ==
There are many examples of different types of technology shocks, but one of the biggest in the past couple of decades has been Web 2.0. Web 2.0 was a huge technological advancement in the e commerce business, it allowed for user interaction benefiting businesses in different ways. It allowed for user feedback, ratings, comments, user content, etc. Web 2.0 revolutionized the online business as a whole, an example of a positive technology shock.

== Real business cycle theory ==
Real business cycle theory (RBCT) is the theory where any type of shock has a ripple effect into many other shocks. To relate this to current times the upward price on oil is a RBCT because of the negative technology shock that happened due to the raise in price for the process of extracting of the oil. Now due to this increase in price for energy to extract the oil, fewer people could afford oil which drove economic activity down and at the same time lessens a countries national GDP. Typically, a RBCT starts with a negative type of shock, which is why the RBCT is becoming less and less relevant in today's economics. More and more economists are arguing against the RBCT because very rarely can you have a negative shock on technology with the amount of advancements we are going through now.

== See also ==
- Supply shock
- Demand shock
