= Demand shock =

Sudden event that temporarily changes demand for goods or services

Graph illustrating relationship between demand and capacity of a network.

In economics, a demand shock is a sudden event that increases or decreases demand for goods or services temporarily.

A positive demand shock increases aggregate demand (AD) and a negative demand shock decreases aggregate demand. Prices of goods and services are affected in both cases. When demand for goods or services increases, its price (or price levels) increases because of a shift in the demand curve to the right. When demand decreases, its price decreases because of a shift in the demand curve to the left. Demand shocks can originate from changes in things such as tax rates, money supply, and government spending. For example, taxpayers owe the government less money after a tax cut, thereby freeing up more money available for personal spending. When the taxpayers use the money to purchase goods and services, their prices go up.

In the midst of a poor economic situation in the United Kingdom in November 2002, the Bank of England's deputy governor, Mervyn King, warned that the domestic economy was sufficiently imbalanced that it ran the risk of causing a "large negative demand shock" in the near future. At the London School of Economics, he elaborated by saying, "Beneath the surface of overall stability in the UK economy lies a remarkable imbalance between a buoyant consumer and housing sector, on the one hand, and weak external demand on the other."

During the 2008 financial crisis and the Great Recession, a negative demand shock in the United States economy was caused by several factors that included falling house prices, the subprime mortgage crisis, and lost household wealth, which led to a drop in consumer spending. To counter this negative demand shock, the Federal Reserve System lowered interest rates. Before the crisis occurred, the world's economy experienced a positive global supply shock. Immediately afterward, however, a positive global demand shock led to global overheating and rising inflationary pressures.

== See also ==
- Shock (economics)
- Supply shock
- Demand-pull inflation
- Technology shock
