= Southern Economic Association =

The Southern Economic Association (SEA) is a regional-based scholarly economic organization based at Texas Tech University. The SEA was founded in 1928. It is one of five general professional economic associations. For the SEA member characteristics (e.g. political affiliation, policy opinions) in relation to the other major economic associations see Klein et al.

From its founding, the purpose of the Association has been to further the education of scholars and the public in economic affairs. Toward this end, it seeks to stimulate interest in and disseminate results of recent research in theory and applied economics.

The membership of the SEA includes a diverse set of scholars, with a great range in their substantive interests and in their methods of inquiry.

== History ==
In October 1927, Walter J. Matherly proposed the founding of the Southern Economic Association. A committee composed of Matherly, Dean Lee Bidgood, Simon E. Leland and James W. Martin created the basic structure of the organization. The first annual session was scheduled to be held on February 20-22, 1928.

== Publications ==
Southern Economic Journal
- Discipline: Economics
- Language: English
- Edited by: Charles Courtemanche

Publication details
- History: 1933–present
- Publisher: Southern Economic Association via Wiley-Blackwell (United States)
- Frequency: Quarterly

Standard abbreviations
- ISO 4: South. Econ. J.

Indexing
- CODEN: SECJAR
- ISSN: 0038-4038 (print); 2325-8012 (web)
- LCCN: 36005384
- JSTOR: 00384038
- OCLC no.: 54396479

Links
- Journal homepage; Online archive

The Southern Economic Journal (SEJ) is a publication of the Southern Economic Association. The journal began its publication in 1933 and it is the 8th oldest American academic journal in the economic profession.
