= Charles L. Evans =

American economist

Charles Evans
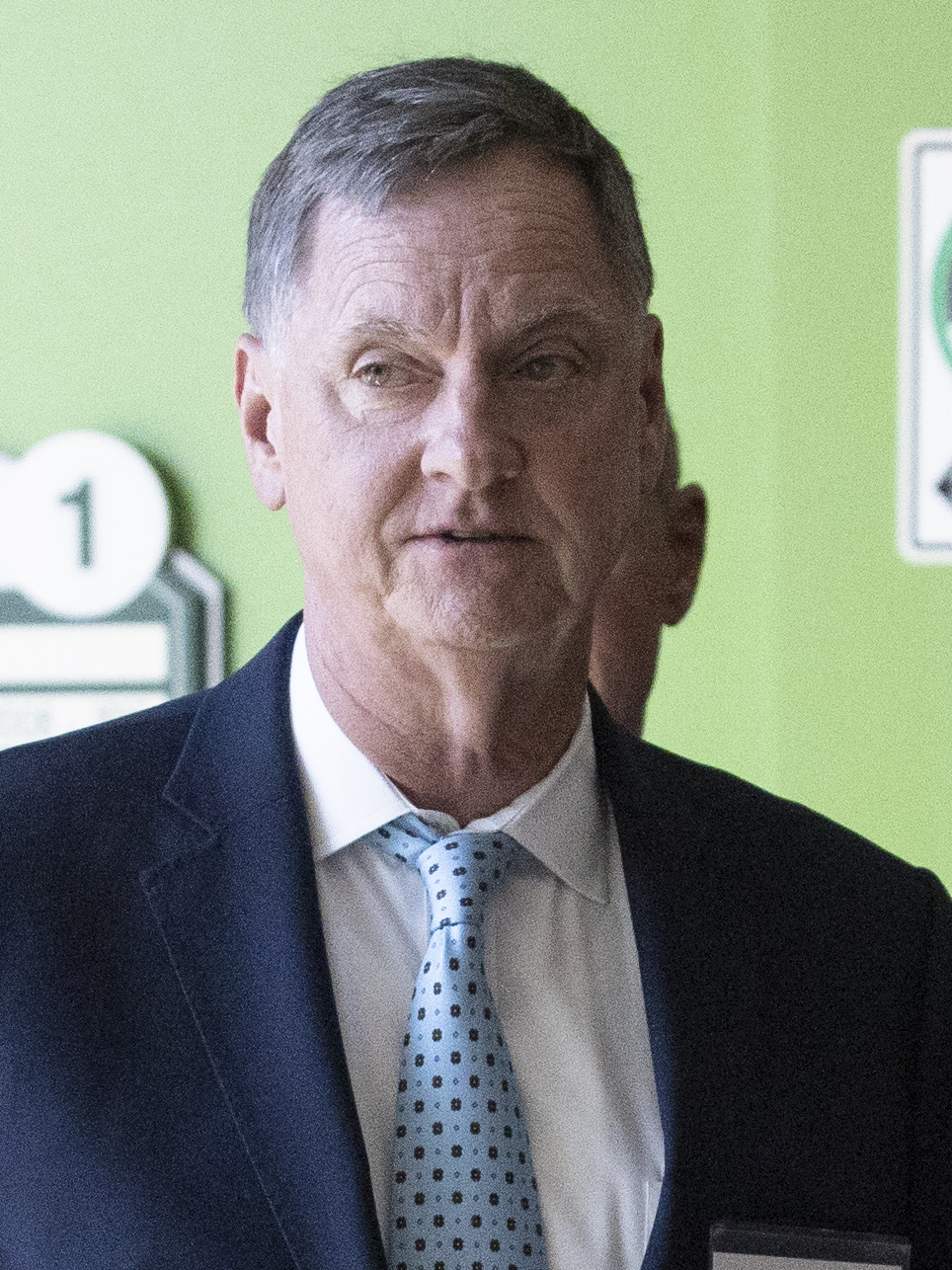
- Evans in 2022

President of the Federal Reserve Bank of Chicago
- In office September 1, 2007 – January 9, 2023
- Preceded by: Michael H. Moskow
- Succeeded by: Austan Goolsbee

Personal details
- Born: January 15, 1958 (age 67)
- Education: University of Virginia (BA); Carnegie Mellon University (MA, PhD)

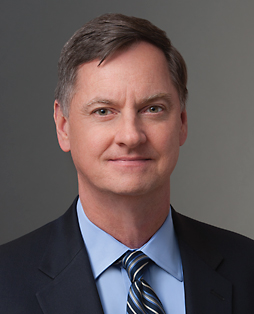
Official portrait

Charles L. Evans (born January 15, 1958) is the former ninth president and chief executive officer of the Federal Reserve Bank of Chicago, serving from 2007 to 2023. In that capacity, he served on the Federal Open Market Committee (FOMC), the Federal Reserve System's monetary policy-making body.

Before becoming president in September 2007, Evans served as director of research and senior vice president, supervising the Bank's research on monetary policy, banking, financial markets, and regional economic conditions. Prior to that, Evans was a vice president and senior economist with responsibility for the macroeconomics research group.

His personal research has focused on measuring the effects of monetary policy on U.S. economic activity, inflation, and financial market prices. It has been published in the Journal of Political Economy, American Economic Review, Journal of Monetary Economics, Quarterly Journal of Economics, and the Handbook of Macroeconomics.

Evans has taught at the University of Chicago, the University of Michigan and the University of South Carolina.

Evans received a bachelor's degree in economics from the University of Virginia and a doctorate in economics from Carnegie Mellon University in Pittsburgh. In 2024, he received an honorary Doctor of Public Service from CMU's Tepper School of Business.

He is married and has two children.

== Evans Rules ==
In December 2012, the Federal Open Market Committee decided to change its broad forward guidance to a more explicit rule. The Evans Rule, a version which had been advocated by Charles Evans for many months, stated that the committee will hold rates near zero at least until unemployment falls below 6.5% or inflation rises above 2.5%. The Committee in March 2014 decided to remove the mention of the explicit thresholds in its guidance, but emphasized that there has been no change in the stance of monetary policy.

Other offices
Preceded by Michael H. Moskow	President of the Federal Reserve Bank of Chicago; 2007–2023	Succeeded by Austan Goolsbee
