= Supply shock =

Sudden event that temporarily changes the supply of goods or services

A supply shock is an event that suddenly increases or decreases the supply of a commodity or service, or of commodities and services in general. This sudden change affects the equilibrium price of the good or service or the economy's general price level.

In the short run, an economy-wide negative supply shock will shift the aggregate supply curve leftward, decreasing the output and increasing the price level. For example, the imposition of an embargo on trade in oil would cause an adverse supply shock, since oil is a key factor of production for a wide variety of goods. A supply shock can cause stagflation due to a combination of rising prices and falling output. The 1973 Oil Crisis is often used as the exemplar case of a supply shock, when OPEC restrictions on production and sale of petroleum resulted in fuel shortages throughout the developed world. International trade wars, such as the 2018 United States–China trade war, constituted a negative supply shock to both nations through tariffs.

In the short run, an economy-wide positive supply shock will shift the aggregate supply curve rightward, increasing output and decreasing the price level. A positive supply shock could be an advance in technology (a technology shock) which makes production more efficient, thus increasing output.

== Technical analysis ==
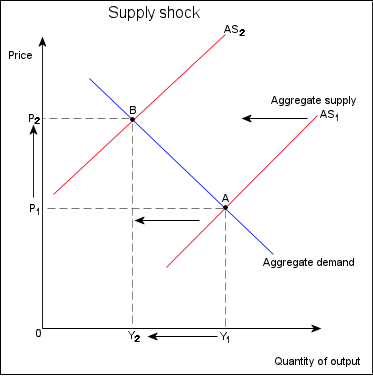
Negative supply shock. The initial position is at point A, producing output quantity Y_{1} at price level P_{1}. When there is a supply shock, this has an adverse effect on aggregate supply: the supply curve shifts left (from AS_{1} to AS_{2}), while the demand curve stays in the same position. The intersection of the supply and demand curves has now moved, and the equilibrium is now point B; quantity has been reduced to Y_{2}, while the price level has been increased to P_{2}.

The slope of a demand curve determines how much the price level and output respond to the shock, with more inelastic demand (and hence a steeper demand curve) causing there to be a larger effect on the price level and a smaller effect on quantity.

== See also ==
- Shock (economics)

- Commodity price shock
- Demand shock
- Technology shock

- Macroeconomics
- Stagflation
- Supply and demand

== Bibliography ==
- Czech, Brian, Supply Shock: Economic Growth at the Crossroads and the Steady State Solution, (Gabriola Island, Canada, 2013)
