= Ayk =

Ayk or AYK may refer to:

== People ==
- Ayk Kazaryan (born 1993), Russian football player of Armenian origin

== Media ==
- Ayk (newspaper), a Lebanese-Armenian daily newspaper

== Abbreviations ==
- Aoyagi Metals Company
- Arkalyk Airport (IATA: AYK), an airport in Kazakhstan
- ISO 639:ayk, ISO for Akuku language

== See also ==
- AN/AYK-14, an airborne computer
- AN/UYK-44, standard 16-bit minicomputer of the United States Navy
- AYK Radiant, an electric 1/10 scale 4WD Radio Control vehicle made by Aoyagi Metals Company (AYK)
