= Sendai Shirō =

Japanese deified person

Sendai Shirō 仙台四郎
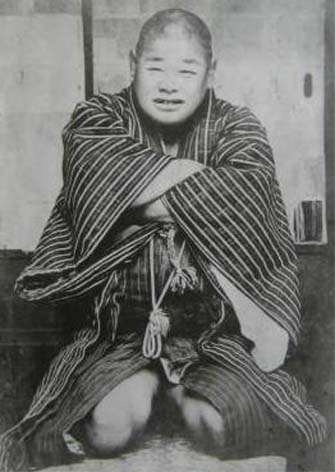
- A photo said to show Shirō around age 30.
- Born: circa 1855 jōkamachi of Sendai Castle, Sendai Domain, Mutsu Province, Tokugawa Shogunate
- Died: circa 1902 (presumed) Sukagawa, Iwase District, Fukushima Prefecture, Empire of Japan

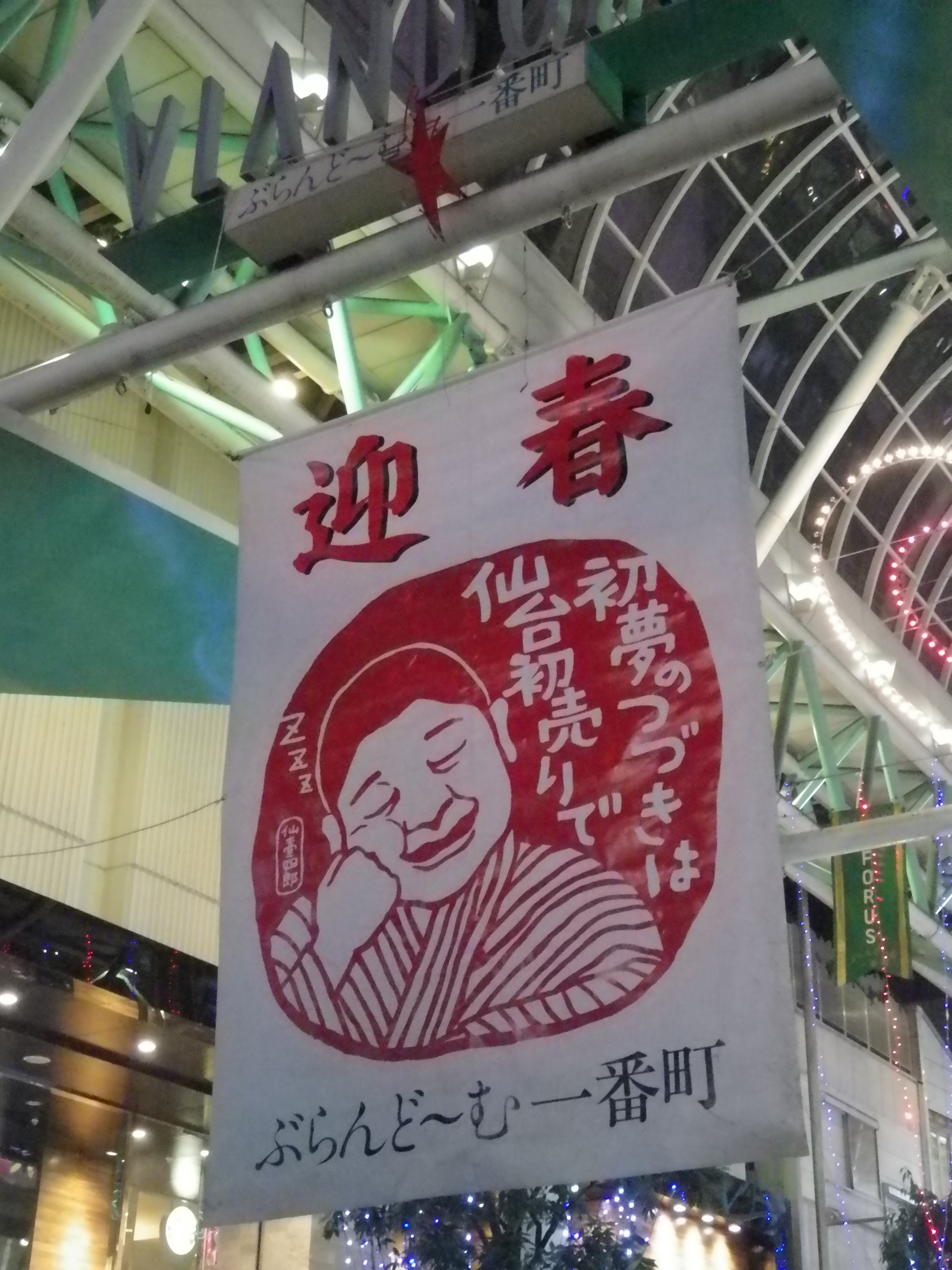
A banner advertising the Sendai New Year's Sale (December 2012). Sendai Shirō has been the mascot of the New Year's Sale since 2002.

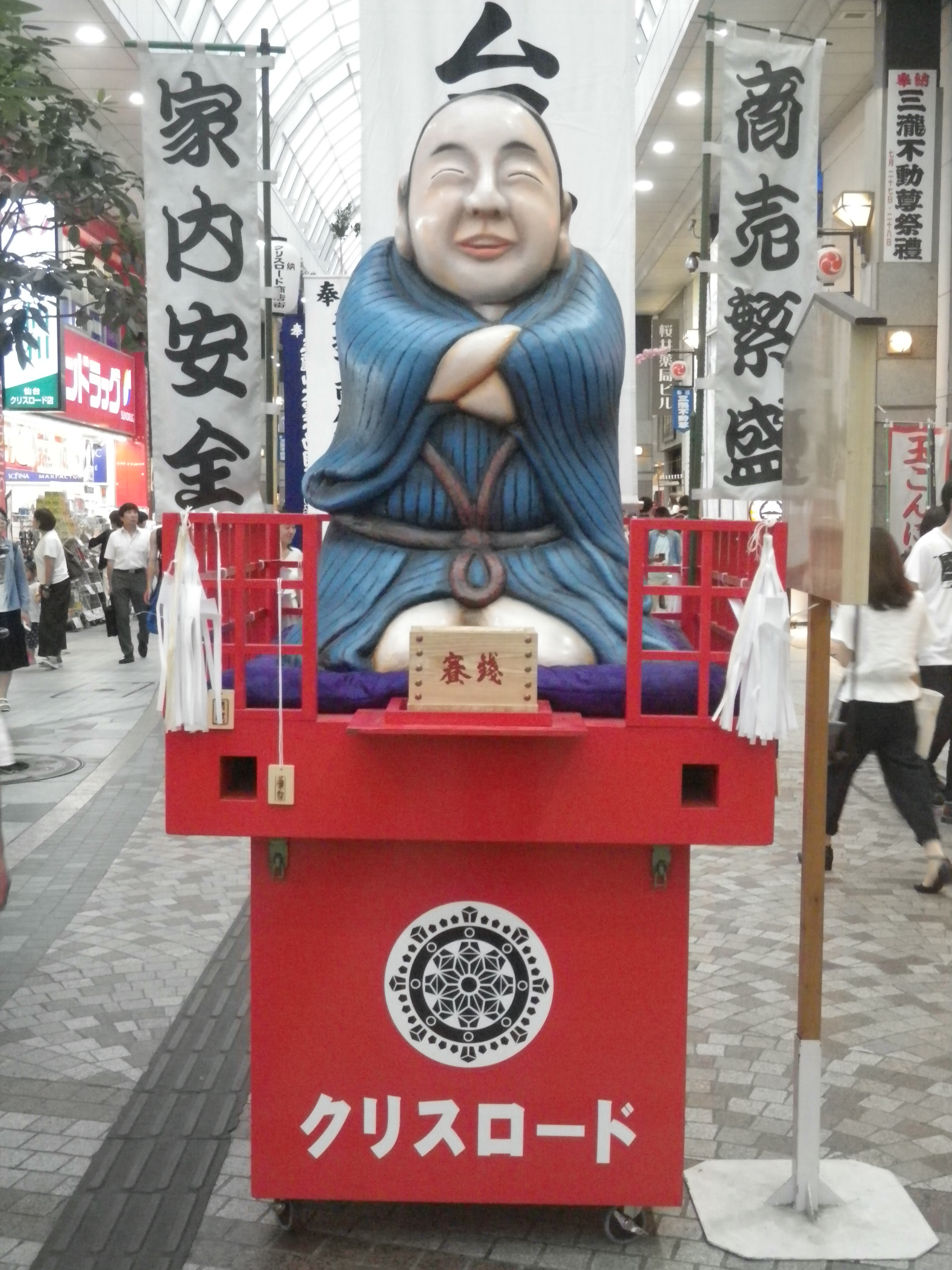
A Sendai Shirō float at the Mitakiyama Fudoin Temple Summer Festival (July 2016)

Sendai Shirō (Note: 仙台四郎, also written as 仙臺四郎 using kyūjitai.) (Note: According to common belief, his real name was Haga Shirō (Japanese: 芳賀 四郎), but according to his relatives, it was Haga Toyotaka (Japanese: 芳賀 豊孝).) (c. 1855 – c. 1902) was an intellectually disabled man who lived in what is now Sendai, Miyagi Prefecture, Japan. He is worshipped as a hitogami associated with prosperity in business, especially in and around his hometown of Sendai.

In the 1870s and 1880s, a superstition spread via newspapers throughout the southern Tōhoku region that any store or restaurant that Shirō chose to visit would be blessed with financial prosperity, and have many customers. Business owners hoping to increase sales treated him well and served him free of charge to encourage him to visit regularly.

After his death, at some point in the early Taishō era (1912–1926), a photographic studio in Sendai started selling photographs of Shirō, claiming that they would likewise bring good fortune to any store they are displayed in. Merchandise depicting Shirō eventually became more popular in Sendai than more traditional good-luck charms, such as Daruma dolls, and a folk religion evolved around his worship, which eventually surpassed that of the commerce gods Inari Ōkami and Ebisu. Starting with the postwar depression that began in 1920, there have been frequent spikes in Shirō's popularity coinciding with economic recessions.

Sendai Shirō became well known throughout the rest of Japan after he was featured in an article in Asahigraph magazine in 1993. Since then, Sendai Shirō has also come to be used as a mascot for the city of Sendai itself. He is depicted in advertisements for the Sendai New Year's Sale and in other corporate advertisements. Japanese stage actors, comedians, and celebrities have used Shirō's appearance and stories from his life as the basis for their performances.

Much about his background remains unknown.

== Life ==
From the Edo period to the 1880s, there was a fire watchtower at the corner of Kitaichibancho street and Kotodai street in Sendai. The area across Kitaichibancho street to the north was called "Yagurashita" (櫓下), which means "Under the Watchtower", up to at least the 19th century. This "Yagurashita" area was home to the Haga family, who had historically served the Date clan (when they ruled the Sendai Domain) as gunners and gunsmiths from the time of Date Masamune in the Sengoku period. Shirō was purportedly born as the fourth son of this family. For this reason, he was also called Yagurashita Shirō (櫓下四郎).

There are two theories regarding Shirō's intellectual disability: one is that he was born with it, and the other is that it was caused by him accidentally falling into the Hirose River while watching fireworks at age 7, becoming unconscious and almost drowning. There are also two theories about his speaking ability: one is that he could only speak a limited number of words, such as "bayan" (meaning "baaya" (ばあや) or "grandmother"), the other is that he was able to speak normally.

As an adult, Shirō would roam freely around the city. He regularly received food and money from charitable people. He never harmed anyone and had a charming appearance, so he was generally well-liked by everyone. He loved children and was always in a good mood and laughing. Although he was sometimes called "Shirō the Idiot" behind his back, the stores he visited mysteriously became prosperous and attracted many people, so he was called a "god of fortune" and treated free of charge wherever he went, but in reality, his family would sometimes pay later. From the perspective of the stores, he was a valued customer who would always pay for the food or drink, no matter how expensive it was. Shirō was an honest man; he never went to a store that he didn't like, even if he was invited.

He seemed to be fond of trains, and when Sendai Station opened on the Tōhoku Main Line in 1887, he visited the station almost every day, riding the train to Shiroishi and Shirakawa. He may have also traveled as far as Fukushima and Yamagata. Sometimes people gave him money for tickets, but often he was unable to pay the fare when he got off at his destination, leading to trouble with the railway company.

Shirō is said to have died in Sukagawa around 1902 at the age of 47, however, there continued to be alleged sightings of him well into the Shōwa era, and as far away as the Port of Busan in Japanese-occupied Korea. The location of his grave is unknown.

== Portrait ==
Shirō had his picture taken by photographer Chiba Hajime in Fukushima around 1885, when he was about 30 years old. At the start of the Taishō era (1912–1926), Chiba Hajime moved from Fukushima to Sendai and opened a photography studio in the city. Chiba Hajime printed the photo of Shirō on postcards and other items and sold them under the name "Meiji God of Fortune (Sendai Shirō-kun)". From this time on, he came to be known as Sendai Shirō.

That photograph is the one pictured above. In this photo, Shirō is wearing a striped kimono, smiling with his hands in his sleeves, with his knees exposed.

There are four versions of the portrait in total: the original photograph, two works by portrait artists, and one pencil drawing. Because of minor differences arising during the reproduction process, several more versions have been confirmed to exist. (The number increased even more after the boom in 1993.) Some of the reproductions show his kimono unbuttoned, while others show his penis clearly visible deep in his lap, providing clear evidence that he was revered as a god of fortune by people from all walks of life.

A Sendai Shirō doll exists that stylistically is thought to date from the early Shōwa Era. This is older than the Sendai Shirō dolls made by Komaya after 1975.

== Rise in popularity ==
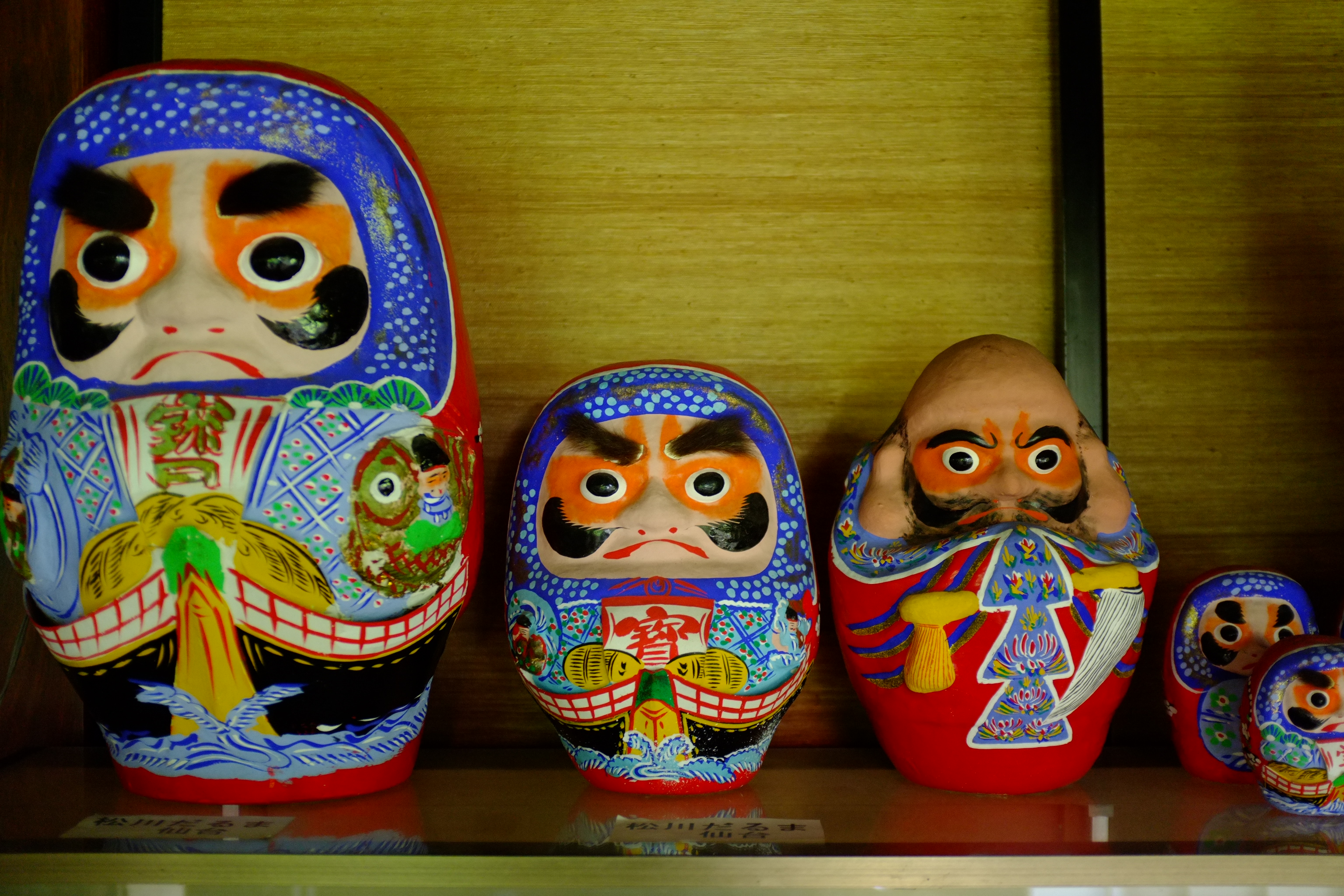
Matsukawa Daruma dolls

Since the Edo period, Matsukawa Daruma (Sendai Daruma) dolls have been used as a good-luck charm for financial prosperity. In reference to the Japanese proverb of "seven falls and eight rises" 七転び八起き (nana korobi ya oki), eight daruma dolls were displayed side by side, and the custom was to burn one in a sacred fire at the Donto Festival or other events and purchase a new one each year. Matsukawa Daruma dolls were generally purchased at the New Years Market held in the city center. but around 1965, during the Japanese economic miracle, the New Years Market was no longer held, and the main sales channel shifted to stalls at festivals held at temples and shrines. In Sendai, retail stores in the central shopping district were converted into tenant buildings, and store chains based in Tokyo or overseas, who were unfamiliar with the Matsukawa Daruma tradition, began to open mainly street-front stores in the area, and the custom of Matsukawa Daruma began to decline.

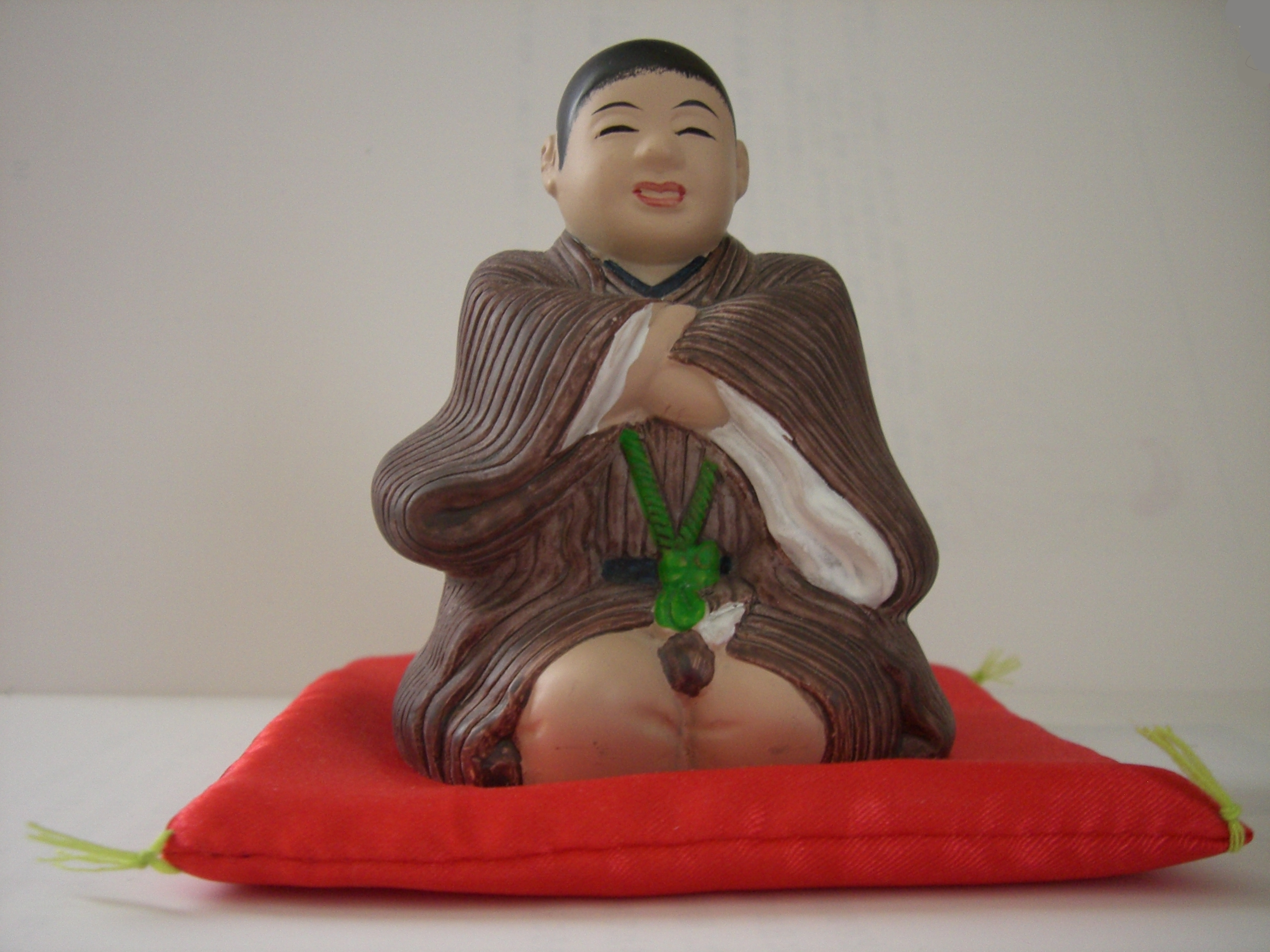
A Sendai Shirō doll

This led to a big rise in the sale of Sendai Shirō merchandise, such as photographs and dolls. As a result, the position of good-luck charm for business prosperity in Sendai shifted from the Matsukawa Daruma dolls, which were placed on the Shinto altar and took up a lot of space, to Sendai Shirō imagery, which could be placed anywhere in the store and took up less space.

In stores and restaurants in Sendai today, pictures and figurines of Sendai Shirō can be seen on the altars and next to the cash register. In souvenir shops, various Shirō dolls can be found.

In April 1986, The "Sendai Shirō Festival" (Organized by the Saito Minoru Design Institute, Hozan Sake Brewery, Mitakiyama Fudoin Temple, and others) was held at the Sasaju Building (at the Corner of Chuo Street and Higashi Nabancho Street, Sendai). The main body of Sendai Shirō was dedicated to Mitakiyama Fudoin Temple.

=== 1993 "Sendai Shirō boom" ===
The current nationwide familiarity with Sendai Shirō began with the 1993 "Sendai Shirō boom". The legend of Sendai Shirō was known to Sendai locals even before that, but the boom led to a large rise in the production of Shirō merchandise. In the 7–14 May 1993 issue of Asahi Graph, Sendai Shirō was featured in "The Seven Wonders of Tōhoku". In this article, the reporter was curious about a photo of Sendai Shirō he saw in Kesennuma, so he investigated further, learning about the popularity of Shirō as a religious charm in stores, and the legend of his life. In response to the article, the tourism department of Sendai and other local organizations were inundated with inquiries about how to obtain photos of Sendai Shirō, and Mitakiyama Fudoin Temple, which had been manufacturing merchandise for some time, increased production. On 27 May of the same year, Kahoku Shimpo newspaper reported that Sendai Shirō products were becoming popular nationwide, with an article titled "Sendai Shirō, the 'God of Fortune' for Business Prosperity, is Booming Again".

These "booms" in the popularity of Sendai Shirō merchandise are usually attributed by local newspapers to economic recessions causing more people to seek Shirō's blessing of financial prosperity. For example, the 1993 boom was attributed to the collapse of the asset price bubble, and the boom in 1986 that coincided with the Sendai Shirō Festival was attributed to the Endaka recession brought about by the Plaza Accord.

== Temples and shrines ==
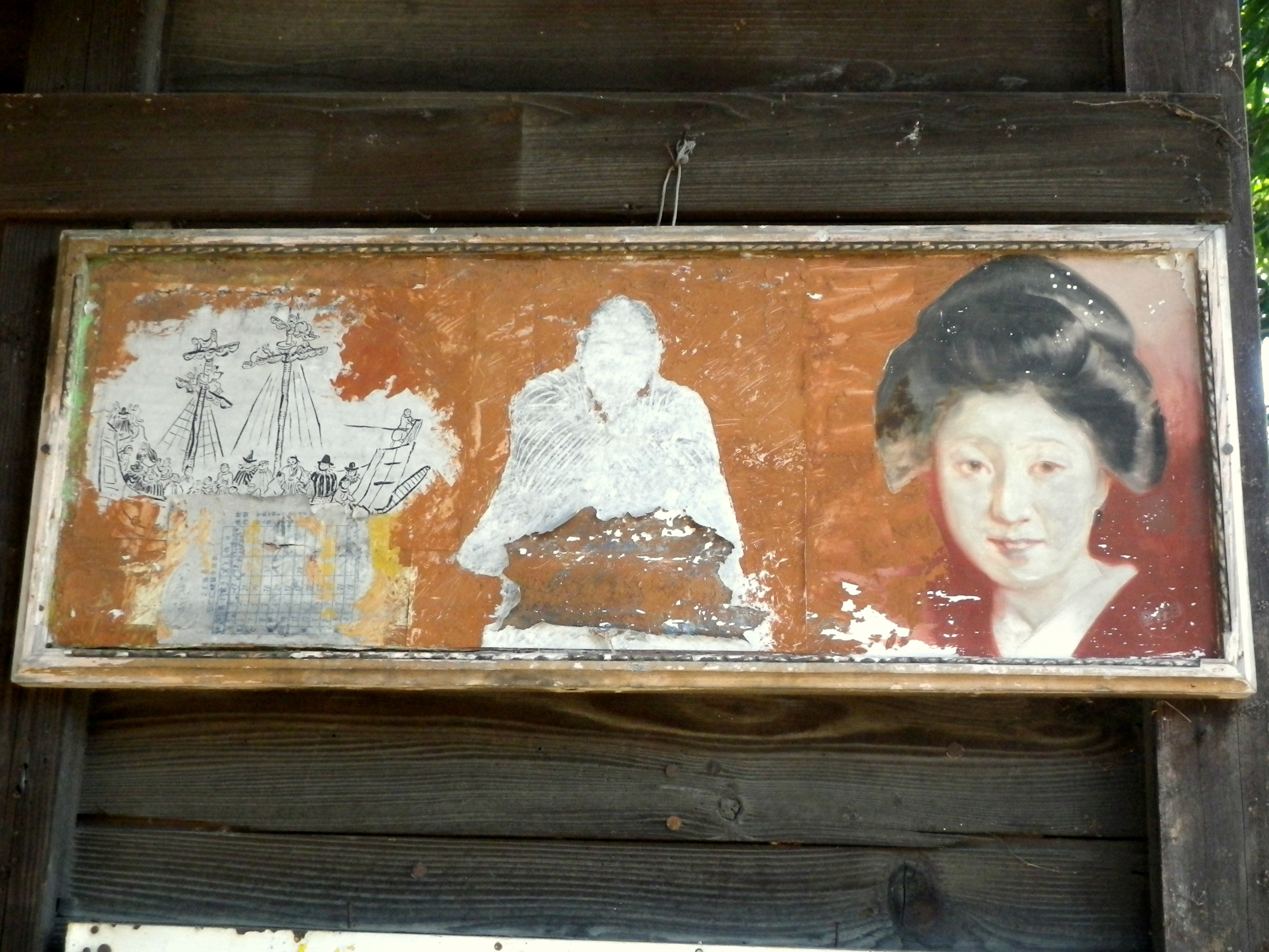
A painting of Sendai Shirō on display at Asahi Shrine (July 2015)

Sendai Shirō has no Buddhist temples or Shinto shrines originally dedicated to him, since his worship arose as a folk religion, but there are some temples and shrines that enshrine both Sendai Shirō and a main deity.

- Mitakiyama Fudoin, a Shingon-shū Chisan-ha Buddhist temple located in Sendai City Center. Sendai Shirō has been enshrined there since 1986.
- Asahi Shrine, also known as Moriko's Shrine, a small Shinto shrine in Aoba Ward, Sendai. Sendai Shirō is enshrined here alongside the deity Toyouke-hime and the spirit of the shrine maiden Asahi-onna A painting of Sendai Shirō hung in front of the shrine until it went missing in 2021.
- In May 1994, a ginkgo tree that was approximately 100 years old, located near the intersection of Kozenji Street and Kitayonbancho Street in Aoba Ward, Sendai, was deemed a sacred tree connected to Shirō, and his picture was displayed there. Later, a wooden shrine and offerings were placed there, and even a sign reading "Ginkgo tree hand-planted by Sendai Shirō". This impromptu shrine was removed after complaints by neighbors.

== In popular culture ==
=== As a mascot ===
- Sendai Shirō has been the official mascot of the Sendai New Year's Sale since 2002, and banners featuring him are displayed during the New Year season.
- A large inflatable of Sendai Shirō dressed as Santa Claus has been hung under the arcade canopy at Chris Road in front of Mitakiyama Fudoin Temple during the Christmas season since 2003.
- A statue labeled "Sendai Station Shirō", depicting Sendai Shirō dressed as a station employee, was installed on the first floor of Sendai Station in 2016.

=== Television ===
- The BS Fuji variety show "Tōhoku Tamashii TV" has a comedy series "Business Prosperity" that parodies Sendai Shirō, featuring "Sendai Goro" (Tomizawa Takeshi) and "Sendai Rokuro" (Kano Eiko).
- Abe Daichi, a former member of the Sendai comedy duo Humpty Dumpty, has been calling himself "Heisei's Sendai Shirō" since he became a sales representative for ariTV after the duo broke up.
- In conjunction with the Sendai-Miyagi Destination Campaign, a Sendai Shirō themed commercial for the JR East "Adult Holiday Club" starring Sayuri Yoshinaga aired in 2013.
- Sendai Shirō has also appeared in commercials and advertisements for Eidai House, a Sendai real estate company, since 2013.

=== Literature ===
- Michinoku (1937) by Kanoko Okamoto
- The Boy who Became a God of Fortune – the Story of Sendai Shirō (1997) by Oka Shuzo

=== Manga ===
- Biographies of Mystics vol. 11 "Mystery" (2001) by Shigeru Mizuki
- Touhou Ibarakasen ~Wild and Horned Hermit~ Episode 7 "The True God Of Fortune" (2011) written by ZUN, illustrations by Azuma Aya.
- Bakumatsu Sendai Commoners: Me and the Fool by Hige-baasan
- Edomae no Shun Episode 1267/68 "God of Fortune" (2024) Original story by Tsukumomori, illustrations by Satou Tero

=== Theater ===
- The Story of Sendai Shirō: The Man who Became a God of Fortune (2009)

=== Music ===
- "Sendai Shirō Shōfuku Ondo" by Willie Sasaki
- "God of Fortune" (2013) by Ichiro Sakai, released by Tokuma Japan Communications
- "The Story of Sendai Shirō". Lyrics by Akane Hori, Music by Yoshinori Kimura, Sung by Toshihiko Kikuchi

=== Art ===
- Kumami Kounen's 1928 folding screen painting of Basho no Tsuji, a crossroads considered the center of Sendai Castle's jōkamachi in the Edo Period, depicts Sendai Shirō. The painting won first place in the Nihonga category at the Tōhoku Industrial Exhibition, and was replicated as a Nishiki-e, which became widely popular.
