= Kazaryan =

Kazaryan is a surname of Eastern European origin. People with the surname include:

- Armen Kazaryan (born 1963), Armenian and Russian art historian
- Ayk Kazaryan (born 1993), Russian football player
- Mikhail Kazaryan, Soviet boxer who defeated Andreas Zülow in 1988
- Mishik Kazaryan (1948–2020), Russian-Armenian physicist
- Nikolay Kazaryan (1947–2023), Armenian football manager who previously played in the Soviet Union
- Slavik Kazaryan, Armenian football referee at the 1997 Commonwealth of Independent States Cup and 1998 Commonwealth of Independent States Cup
- Yurii Kazaryan, founding guitarist of Ukrainian black metal band White Ward

== Armenian Heroes of the Soviet Union ==
In the List of Armenian Heroes of the Soviet Union

- Andranik Kazaryan
- Ashkharbek Kazaryan
- Ashot Kazaryan
- Hamayak Kazaryan

== See also ==
- Kazarian, a surname
