= Setouchi Retreat Aonagi =

Coordinates: 33.923°N 132.817°E

Setouchi Aonagi
- Native name: 瀬戸内リトリート青凪
- Founded: December 2015
- Headquarters: onkochishin. inc (株式会社温故知新) in Tokyo, Japan
- Key people: Tomoki Matsuyama
- Website: https://www.setouchi-aonagi.com/

Setouchi Aonagi, also Setouchi Retreat Aonagi (瀬戸内リトリート青凪), is a Japanese hotel near Matsuyama, Ehime Prefecture, Japan. It was opened in winter 2015. The building was designed by Tadao Ando, a Japanese architect, in the final years of the Japan bubble era. The hotel was originally designed as a museum.

== Design ==
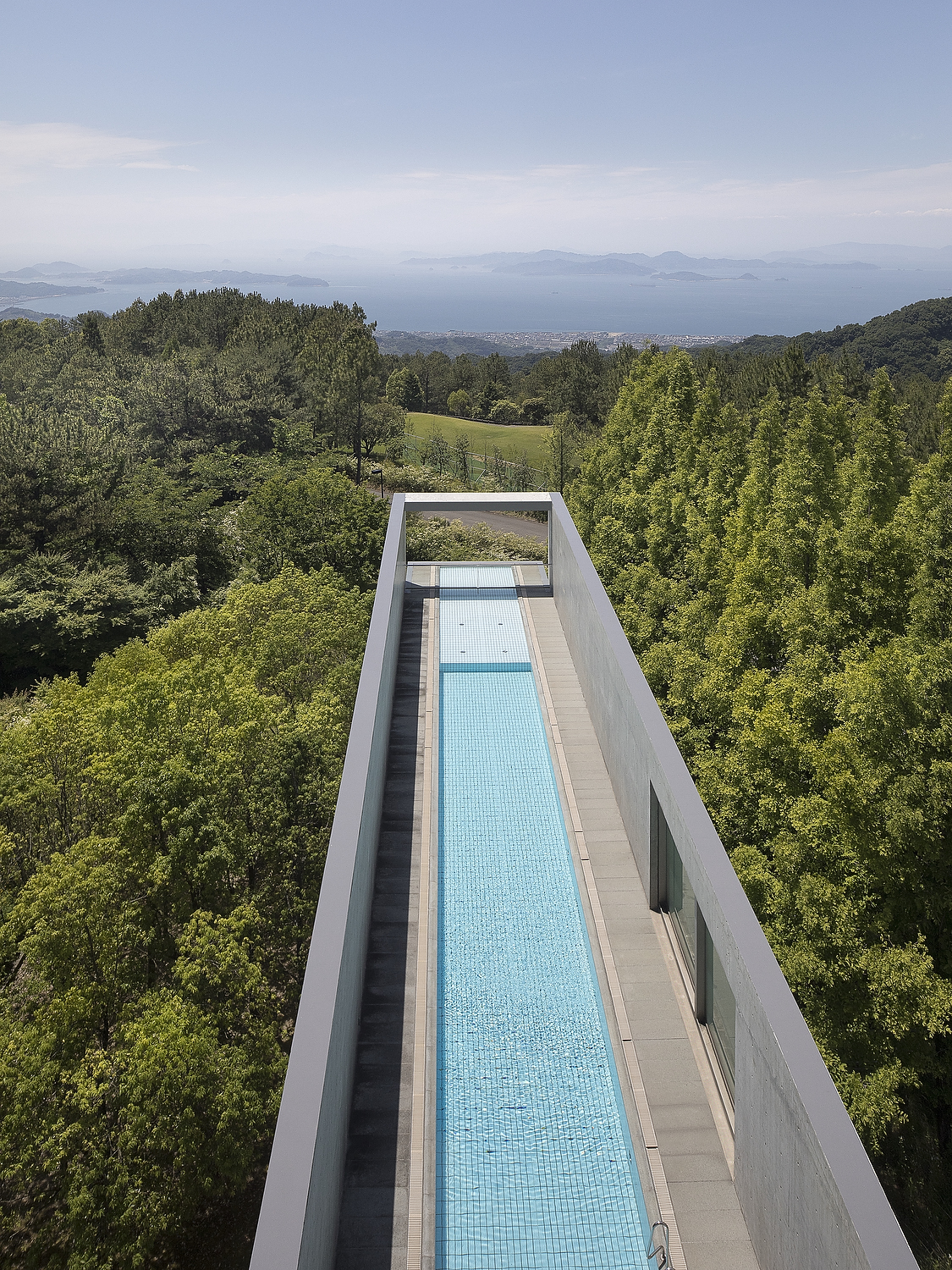
Infinity pool of Setouchi Retreat Aonagi

There are 2 buildings in the hotel.

Most of the space is now utilised as hotel rooms. There are 7 rooms in the hotel - the smallest room is 106.2 m2 and the largest is 169.6 m2.

There are 2 pools in the hotel. One of these is a rooftop infinity pool facing the Seto Inland Sea. The rooftop pool was designed as a concrete-framed lap pool by Tadao Ando

Since the buildings were a museum before, it also has art galleries and many art pieces. The dining room is also built into one of the art galleries and faces a Japanese garden.

== Management ==
The hotel is now managed by a Japanese hotel management company, onkochishin. inc（株式会社温故知新）.

== Award ==
Five Red Pavilions in “MICHELIN GUIDE HIROSHIMA EHIME 2018”
