= Aoyagi Metals Company =

- Type: Private
- Founded: 1960s
- Defunct: early 1990s
- Headquarters: Edogawa, Tokyo, Japan
- Products: Radio-controlled model cars, slot cars

Aoyagi Metals Industry Co. Ltd (青柳金属工業有限会社, Aoyagi Kinzoku Kōgyō Yūgen-gaisha) (commonly known as Ayk in America and Aoyagi in Japan) was a Japanese company that became notable in the 1980s for its radio-controlled cars.

The company began in the 1960s manufacturing metal chassis for slotcar racing; 1978 saw the introduction of the RX1200, a 1:12 scale on-road racer, which was the start of the RX series of 1/12-scale on-road chassis. The RX2000 followed and took the Japan Model Racing Car Association All-Japan Championship title in 1980, the first of three consecutive titles for the company. In 1984, Joel Johnson won the title on his first trip to Japan with Trinity.

Conventional manufacturers mounted their differential gears between the right rear wheel and the motor compartment, but Ayk placed theirs within the axle, which centered the weight more proportionately and kept the differential gears protected. By 1984, they resorted to an outboard gear diff much like the current Delta of the time.

In 1982, the same year that AYK took its third consecutive 1:12 title (with the RX3000 EXL480), like other manufacturers, Ayk broke into the 1:10 off-road buggy market with the 566 B Super Trail. The buggy included aluminum chassis, enclosed transmission with all-aluminum gears, and a waterproof radio case. This model was closely followed in the early eighties by a series of race-ready 1/10 off-road buggies which saw reasonable success on the semi-pro circuit.

By the mid-1980s, Ayk abandoned the 1:10 two-wheel-drive off-road to concentrate on off-road four-wheel-drive models and on-road 1/12 scale.

After winning the Japan Model Racing Car Association 1:12 on-road title with the Super Parsec, the company began its decline following the death of its president in 1989. The Japanese asset price bubble (バブル景気 baburu keiki) bursting in Japan was the other primary reason AYK closed down. These two events had more to do with AYK closing than the common overseas racing car market rumor.

One of its staff members, Tatsuro Watanabe, left the company by 1986 to emigrate to the United States to start up Hobby Products International, a company specialising in radio-controlled cars. Later on, some other employees found themselves working either for his company (Hiroyuki Iida) or rival manufacturer Mugen Seiki (Takashi Aizawa and Koji Sanada).

The Koiwa Ayk office still stands, although the service center is now an apartment complex.

== Current market ==
Due to relatively small numbers, imported examples of AYK radio controlled cars are now extremely rare outside Japan and as such have inflated prices. Prices in Japan have also risen on and off-road cars dues to the ease that the Internet allows overseas buyers to use Japanese auctions. While 1/12 on-road still may be purchased at reasonable prices from the Japanese second hand market due to this class being less popular with overseas buyers. Early 1/10th AYK radio controlled cars from the 'golden era' (the early to mid 1980s command high prices) Many AYK slot cars seem to have been imported to Australia and were actually stamped and sold as AYK. Australia would be a better source for AYK cars if one is hunting.

== Slot cars ==
AYK manufactured slot car chassis that included brass chassis, stamped steel chassis (similar to the Flexi from Parma), and a bolt together parallel dragster chassis to name a few. One item of note from AYK was the controller that AYK made for slot car racing. Unlike the current controllers that are all based on the Ruskit, AYK manufactured a controller that was held in the left hand and had a lever that controlled the speed using the right hand. This controller was the standard in Japan for a while. AYK also OEM various slot car parts and chassis to American companies. AYK also produced OEM parts for such companies such as Trinity during the 1980s for the 1/10-scale buggy market.

== Motor sports ==
AYK sponsored the Nissan Fairlady ZC team in the WEC Championship. This car was copied in 1/12 scale by AYK and is one of the bodies available in the RG Impulse Kit. AYK also sponsored Toshio Suzuki's Formula 3 entry; the car was either Toyota or Alfa Romeo powered. The March 803 was red with blue three-color AYK logos, one on each side and one forward of the cockpit. These logos were hand-cut by AYK chief of media design.

== 1/12 on-road ==
The chassis are listed followed by the bodies that were available with the kits in the Japanese market. Race Prep (who was the second importer of AYK in America) kits are not included as a complete list is not available at this time.

- RX1200 (Big Nova / Big March / Big Renault Alpine A442-B / Big Martini Porsche 936–78)
- RX1200 Type 2 (March 76S/ Nova 53S)
- RX2000 (Chevron B36 / KIR 801 / Nova 54S)
- RX3000 Basic (Porsche 935K3 / Capri Turbo)
- RX3000 Super Expert (Moon Craft Special / AYK Special)/ RX-L (AYK Special)
- RX-L (AYK Special)
- EXL480K (Porsche 956 / AYK Special)
- RS401i Cyclone (Kremer Porsche / Lancia LC / AYK Special 2)
- RF4WD Quattro (Kremer Porsche / Lancia LC / Grand Champion Special)
- RG Impulse (Fairlady 280Z / Fairlady 300Z / Fairlady ZC)
- CX4WDi Quattro (Auto Coast / Porsche 956) – This chassis was designed by the owner of the Ichimura Circuit in Yokohama. The car was further developed jointly by AYK and Kyosho. This is the reason CX4WDi and Kyosho Fanthom look very similar.
- 86J (Lancia LC2 / Intercepter2)
- CRX Parsec (AYK Special 3 / Porsche 962)
- CRX Parsec II (Precede / Porsche 962)
- Super Parsec (Precede)
- Super Parsec SE (Grand Champion 88)
- Super Parsec Basic (Grand Champion 88)
- Super Parsec SV (Grand Champion 88)
- Bun Bun Racer (956/99t/Benz 190/Pontiac Trans-Am)

== OEM ==
R&D Ishihara is a company named after its founder Naoki Ishihara. He is a 1/12-scale racer in Japan that developed his own ideas about what he needed in a 1/12-scale car. Before the introduction of the NX series he was producing his own after market parts for 1/12-scale cars. Even though AYK produced the NX series, they still competed against them with their own series of cars. Ishihara is not the only company AYK produced cars for, many European companies imported AYK cars and simply placed their sticker on the box.

- NX101 Roadrunner
- NX101 Roadrunner OPT
- NX101 Roadrunner J2
- NX201 Roadrunner R

== 1/10 off-road ==
- 566B Super Trail
- Sidewinder
- Boxer
- Buffalo
- Bobcat
- Viper / Viper Shuttle
- Radiant
- Radiant Pro
- Boost
- Maveric
- Ascar limited production
- Bun Bun Off Roader (Mitsubishi Pajero)

== Accessories ==
- TX100 / 200 / 300 / 400F / 400FR / 500F (chargers)
- RS200 / RS300 / 500T (tire cutters)
- SB100 (wheel balancer)
- GZ1200 / GZ1200R/GZ1200RB (motors)
- GZ240/480/240E/480B (motors)
- Magnum 240R/480R/480Z/240RE/727/300B/600/360L/360LB (motors)
- Command ST/240R/480R/240XG/480XG (motors)
- GX1200 (Black diff cover) / GX1200N (carbon diff cover) / GX1200S (diff sets)
- Dino / Dino MAX / Dino Jr. (Esc)
- DC-100F (discharger)
- SX300 (motor spray)
- High Speed 1200 (Washing spray)?
- Pole Position (com drops Lube)
- Car Carrier
- RS300 Tire Cutter
