= Louvre Accord =

1987 international agreement

The Louvre Accord (formally, the Statement of the G6 Finance Ministers and Central Bank Governors) was an agreement, signed on February 22, 1987, in Paris, that aimed to stabilize international currency markets and halt the continued decline of the US dollar after 1985 following the Plaza Accord. It was considered, from a relational international contract viewpoint, as a rational compromise solution between two ideal-type extremes of international monetary regimes: the perfectly flexible and the perfectly fixed exchange rates.

The agreement was signed by Canada, France, West Germany, Japan, the United Kingdom, and the United States. The Italian government was invited to sign the agreement but declined.

== Background ==
A precursor to the Louvre Accord was the Plaza Accord, which was agreed upon during the G7 Minister of Finance meeting held in New York in 1985 and aimed to depreciate the US dollar relative to the Japanese yen and German Deutsche Mark. The United States had a trade deficit while Japan and a few European countries were experiencing a trade surplus along with negative GDP growth. The then U.S. Treasury Secretary James Baker attempted to address the imbalance by encouraging its trade partners to stimulate their economies so they can purchase more from it. He maintained that if these partners did not grow, he would allow the dollar's continued depreciation.

After the Plaza Accord, the dollar depreciated, reaching an exchange rate of ¥150 per US$1 in 1987. By this time, the nominal dollar exchange rate against other currencies had fallen more than 25%. The ministers of the G7 nations gathered at the French finance ministry, then located inside the Louvre Palace in Paris, to minimize this decline and stabilize it around the prevailing levels. The Louvre Accord may have helped prevent a recession because it stopped the US dollar from decreasing further in relation to other currencies.

== Provisions ==
France agreed to reduce its budget deficits by 1% of GDP and cut taxes by the same amount for corporations and individuals. Japan would reduce its trade surplus and cut interest rates. The United Kingdom would reduce public expenditures and reduce taxes. Germany, the real object of this agreement because of its leading economic position in Europe, would reduce public spending, cut taxes for individuals and corporations, and keep interest rates low. The United States would reduce its fiscal 1988 deficit to 2.3% of GDP from an estimated 3.9% in 1987, reduce government spending by 1% in 1988 and keep interest rates low.

== Impact ==
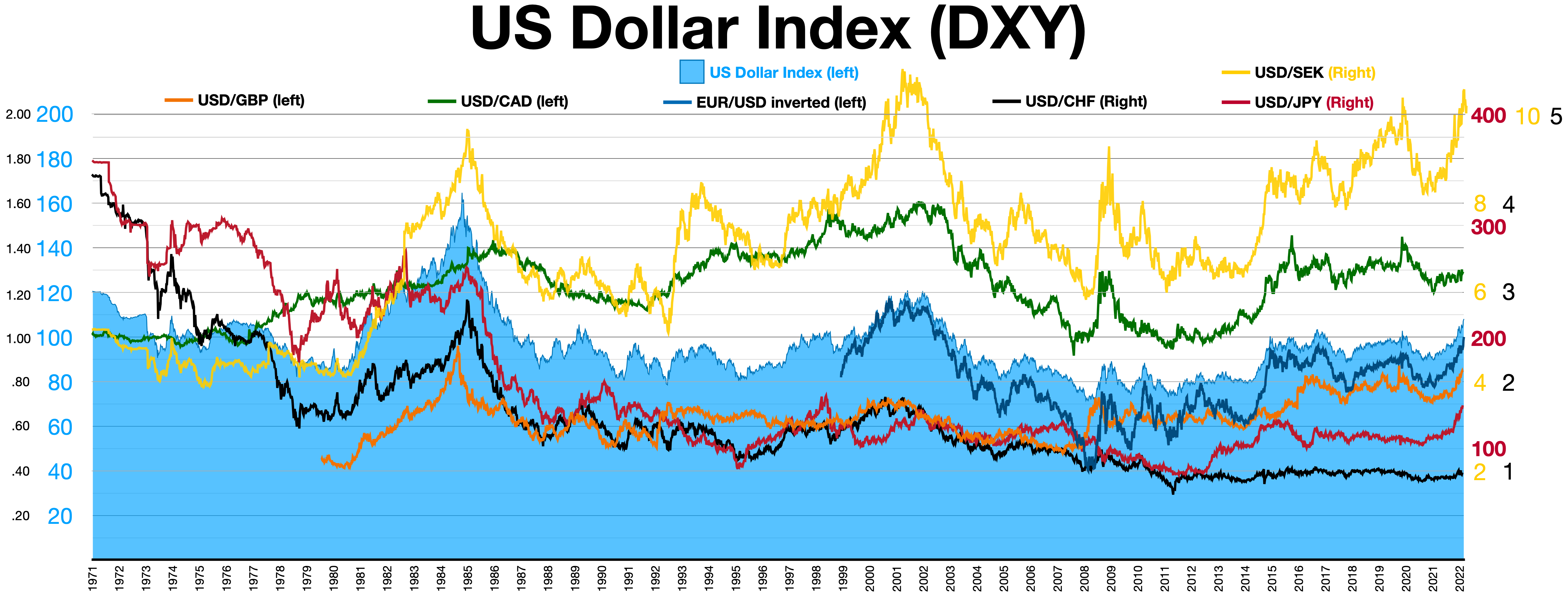
US Dollar Index (DXY) USD/GBP exchange rate USD/Canadian dollar exchange rate EUR/USD (inverted) exchange rate USD/JPY exchange rate USD/SEK exchange rate USD/CHF exchange rate

The US dollar continued to weaken in 1987 against the Deutsche Mark and other major currencies, reaching a low of 1.57 marks per dollar and 121 yen per dollar in early 1988. The dollar then strengthened over the next 18 months, reaching over 2.04 marks per dollar and 160 yen per dollar, in tandem with the Federal Reserve raising interest rates aggressively, from 6.50% to 9.75%.
