= Carry (investment) =

Return or cost of holding an asset

The carry of an asset is the return obtained from holding it (if positive), or the cost of holding it (if negative) (see also cost of carry). For instance, commodities are usually negative carry assets, as they incur storage costs or may suffer from depreciation. But in some circumstances, appropriately hedged commodities can be positive carry assets if the forward/futures market is willing to pay sufficient premium for future delivery. An example of high carry asset is gold during a financial crisis, due to its safe haven quality.

A carry trade is a trade in which profit is incurred from the spread between borrowing a low carry asset and lending a high carry one. Carry trades turn profit only if nothing changes against the carry's favor, and thus they are not necessarily arbitrages, which need to be risk-free. The term carry trade, without further modification, refers to currency carry trade, in which investors borrow low-yielding currencies and lend (invest in) high-yielding currencies.

== Interest rate carry trade ==
An instance of carry trade is called maturity transformation, which is a carry trade using a difference in interest rates. This is commonly practised by commercial banks. Traditional revenue stream from commercial banks is to borrow cheap (at the low overnight rate, i.e., the rate at which they pay depositors) and lend expensive (at the long-term rate, which is usually higher than the short-term rate). This works with an upward-sloping yield curve, but it loses money if the curve becomes inverted. Many investment banks, such as Bear Stearns, have failed because they borrowed cheap short-term money to fund higher interest bearing long-term positions. When the long-term positions default, or the short-term interest rate rises too high (or there are simply no lenders), the bank cannot meet its short-term liabilities and goes under.

== Currency carry trade ==
A currency carry trade is an uncovered interest arbitrage. The term carry trade, without further modification, refers to currency carry trade: investors borrow low-yielding currencies and lend (invest in) high-yielding currencies. It is thought to correlate with global financial and exchange rate stability and retracts in use during global liquidity shortages, but the carry trade is often blamed for rapid currency value collapse and appreciation.

A risk in carry trading is that foreign exchange rates may change in such a way that the investor would have to pay back more expensive currency with less valuable currency. In theory, according to uncovered interest rate parity, carry trades should not yield a predictable profit because the difference in interest rates between two countries should equal the rate at which investors expect the low-interest-rate currency to rise against the high-interest-rate one. However, carry trades weaken the currency that is borrowed (eg, Argentine peso), because investors sell the borrowed money by converting it to another currency (eg, US dollar).

By early year 2007, it was estimated that some US$1 trillion may have been staked on the yen carry trade by Mrs. Watanabe. Since the mid-1990s, the Bank of Japan has set Japanese interest rates at very low levels making it profitable to borrow Japanese yen to fund activities in other currencies. These activities include subprime lending in the US, and funding of emerging markets, especially BRIC countries and resource-rich countries. The trade largely collapsed in 2008 particularly in regard to the yen.

The European Central Bank extended its quantitative easing programme in December 2015. Accommodative ECB monetary policy made low-yielding EUR an often-used funding currency for investment in risk assets. The EUR was gaining in times of market stress (such as falls in China stocks in January 2016), although it was not a traditional safe-haven currency.

Most research on carry trade profitability was done using a large sample size of currencies. However, small retail traders have access to limited currency pairs, which are mostly composed of the major G20 currencies, and experience reductions in yields after factoring in various costs and spreads.

=== Known risks ===
The 2008–2011 Icelandic financial crisis has among its origins the undisciplined use of the carry trade. Particular attention has been focused on the use of Euro-denominated loans to purchase homes and other assets within Iceland. Most of these loans defaulted when the relative value of the Icelandic currency depreciated dramatically, causing loan payment to be unaffordable.

The US dollar and the Japanese yen have been the currencies most heavily used in carry trade transactions since the 1990s. There is some substantial mathematical evidence in macroeconomics that larger economies have more immunity to the disruptive aspects of the carry trade mainly due to the sheer quantity of their existing currency compared to the limited amount used for FOREX carry trades, but the collapse of the carry trade in 2008 is often blamed within Japan for a rapid appreciation of the yen. As a currency appreciates, there is pressure to cover any debts in that currency by converting foreign assets into that currency. This cycle can have an accelerating effect on currency valuation changes. When a large swing occurs, this can cause a carry reversal. The timing of the carry reversal in 2008 contributed substantially to the credit crunch which caused the 2008 financial crisis, though relative size of impact of the carry trade with other factors is debatable. A similar rapid appreciation of the US dollar occurred at the same time, and the carry trade is rarely discussed as a factor for this appreciation.

== See also ==
- Carrying charge
- Convenience yield
- Covered interest arbitrage
- Demurrage currency
- Endaka
- Interest rate parity
- Spot-future parity
