= Kazarian =

Kazarian may refer to:

- Frankie Kazarian (born 1977), American professional wrestler
- Paul Kazarian (born 1955), Armenian-American investor, financier, businessperson, and philanthropist
- Jerry Kazarian (born 1954), retired Armenian-American soccer forward who spent two seasons in the North American Soccer League

== See also ==
- Kazaryan, a surname
