= Mrs. Watanabe =

Japanese private investor

Mrs. Watanabe, also known as Kimono Trader, is a term that gained prominence in the early 2000s, representing a stereotype associated with Japanese retail foreign exchange (FX) traders. These individuals became notable for their active participation in FX trading, which had a significant impact on global currency markets and garnered attention on a worldwide scale.

The term Mrs. Watanabe was used as early as the 1980s, although a 1997 reference in The Economist became well known. Watanabe (渡辺) is a common surname in Japan, but not the most common. Despite the "Mrs." honorific, about 85% of the retail currency traders in Japan as of 2019 are male, mostly in their 30s, 40s and 50s. Gearoid Reidy of Bloomberg News concluded after research that "Mrs. Watanabe"'s meaning changed over time from a Japanese equivalent of Joe Sixpack or Joe Bloggs to specifically referring to FX traders.

Due to the low interest rates in Japan, traders can borrow a large quantity of yen with a margin account, and use it to buy currencies from economies where interest rates are much higher (e.g. Turkish lira, Mexican peso, and South African rand), a currency carry trade.

== See also ==
- FX Fighter Kurumi-chan, a Japanese manga and anime series about retail FX trading
