= Nui Onoue =

Japanese businesswoman (1930–2014)

Nui Onoue (尾上縫, Onoue Nui; born 1930, died 2014) was the former owner of the Japanese restaurant "Egawa" in Osaka, Japan. At the end of the 1980s, Onoue for a short time handled astronomical sums of investment capital, becoming one of the people symbolizing the Japanese bubble economy. In the last stages of the bubble the financing of her stock purchases turned sour and she was arrested, tried and convicted of fraud involving financial institutions.

== Investment fraud ==
Onoue's restaurant flourished when she earned a reputation of accurately predicting stock market trends and horse racing outcomes for her customers. With the advent of the bubble her predictions became uncanny, and many customers from security financing and banks visited her restaurant as she became better known as a fortune teller than a restaurant owner.

Before long, she personally took large loans from banks and started trading stocks. During the bubble's climax in 1988, she had received loans from financial institutions of 227 billion yen, held close to 40 billion yen in timed deposits, had made a profit of 4.8 billion yen from stocks, purchased 28.8 billion yen worth of warikō discounted bonds, and paid 5.5 billion yen in margin interest to keep the portfolio afloat. By the climax of the economic bubble, Onoue had become the largest single investor in all of Japan, as well as one of the world's wealthiest people, with her portfolio having accumulated a worth of $4.4 billion.

When the gloom of the bubble became visible, however, her investments suddenly worsened and she acquired astronomical debt. At that point she escalated a fraudulent behaviour that she had been involved in previously: her scam consisted of having bank managers of her acquaintance working at Tōyō Shinyo Kinko bank to issue fake certificates of deposit in her name, which she would present as proof to other financial institutions of her credit worthiness, against which other banks would in turn release securities against which she traded stocks and bonds. Until her arrest, she fraudulently acquired 342 billion yen from 12 financial institutions, including non-commercial banks.

Before long this forgery of securities was discovered, which led to her arrest for fraud on August 13, 1991. The money she borrowed from financial institutions amounted to a total of 2 trillion 773.6 billion yen, with returned payments amounted to a total of 2 trillion 306 billion yen. The bankruptcy proceedings which began after her detention set her total debt at 430 billion yen, the highest ever accumulated by an individual in Japan.

In court, Onoue's lawyers hoped to argue that she held no responsibility as she had absolutely no knowledge of stocks and was being manipulated by her surroundings; the defense strategy failed and she was sentenced to 12 years in prison.

As a direct result of the fraud, neither of the two banks that handled huge amounts of Onoue's financing exist today. The Industrial Bank of Japan was consumed in a merger with Fuji Bank that created Mizuho Corporate Bank, and the financially failed Tōyō Shinyo Kinko bank partially merged with a number of prefectural credit unions.

== Religion ==
In the end of 1970, according to former high school principal Hiraoka Shizuto, Onoue became a nun at Mount Kōya's Kongōbuji Hōon'in temple and adapted the name of Junkō. Being closely acquainted with the Hiraoka family, she participated on an enlightenment tour to a Buddhist temple in India (Gyume temple), organized by the family. At that time, Onoue donated 20 million yen to the Gyume temple, but the Hiraoka family stresses that they made the donation. On the same tour, Onoue and Hiraoka together met the Dalai Lama. After that, Hiraoka invited the Dalai Lama to the Nenbutsu sect's Temple of Immeasurable Happiness.
