= Plaza Accord =

1985 international agreement on fiscal policy

Announcement of the Ministers of Finance and Central Bank Governors of France, Germany, Japan, the United Kingdom, and the United States
- The 1985 "Plaza Accord" is named for New York City's Plaza Hotel, where finance ministers reached an agreement about managing the fluctuating value of the US dollar. Gerhard Stoltenberg of West Germany, left, Pierre Bérégovoy of France, James Baker of the United States, Nigel Lawson of Britain, and Noboru Takeshita of Japan.
- Signed: September 22, 1985
- Signatories: (France) Pierre Bérégovoy; (Germany) Gerhard Stoltenberg; (Japan) Noboru Takeshita; (United Kingdom) Nigel Lawson; (United States) James Baker
- Parties: France; West Germany; Japan; United Kingdom; United States
- Language: English

The Plaza Accord was a joint agreement signed on September 22, 1985, at the Plaza Hotel in New York City, between France, West Germany, Japan, the United Kingdom, and the United States, to depreciate the U.S. dollar in relation to the French franc, the German Deutsche Mark, the Japanese yen and the British pound sterling by intervening in currency markets. The U.S. dollar depreciated significantly from the time of the agreement until it was replaced by the Louvre Accord in 1987. Some commentators believe the Plaza Accord contributed to the Japanese asset price bubble of the late 1980s.

== Background ==
The tight monetary policy of the Federal Reserve's Chairman Paul Volcker and the expansionary fiscal policy of President Ronald Reagan's first term in 1981–84 pushed up long-term interest rates and attracted capital inflow, appreciating the dollar. The French government was strongly in favor of currency intervention to reduce it, but US administration officials, such as Treasury Secretary Donald Regan and Under Secretary for Monetary Affairs, Beryl Sprinkel, opposed such plans, considering the strong dollar a vote of confidence in the US economy and supporting the concept of free market above all else. At the 1982 G7 Versailles Summit, the US agreed to a request by the other members to a study of the effectiveness of foreign currency intervention, which resulted in the Jurgensen Report at the 1983 G7 Williamsburg Summit, but it was not as supportive of intervention as the other leaders had hoped. As the dollar's appreciation kept rising and the trade deficit grew even more, the second Reagan administration viewed currency intervention in a different light. In January 1985, James Baker became the new Treasury Secretary, and Baker's aide Richard Darman became Deputy Secretary of the Treasury. David Mulford joined as the new Assistant Secretary for International Affairs.

From 1980 to 1985, the dollar had appreciated by about 50% against the Japanese yen, Deutsche Mark, French franc, and British pound, the currencies of the next four biggest economies at the time. In March 1985, just before the G7, the dollar reached its highest valuation ever against the British pound, a valuation which would remain untopped for over 30 years. This caused considerable difficulties for the American industry, but at first, their lobbying was largely ignored by the government. The financial sector was able to profit from the rising dollar, and a depreciation would have run counter to the Reagan administration's plans for bringing down inflation. A broad alliance of manufacturers, service providers, and farmers responded by running an increasingly high-profile campaign asking for protection against foreign competition. Major players included grain exporters, the U.S. automotive industry, heavy American manufacturers like Caterpillar Inc., as well as high-tech companies including IBM and Motorola. By 1985, their campaign had acquired sufficient traction for Congress to begin considering passing protectionist laws. The negative prospect of trade restrictions spurred the White House to begin the negotiations that led to the Plaza Accord.

The devaluation was justified to reduce the U.S. current account deficit, which had reached 3.5% of the GDP, and to help the U.S. economy to emerge from a serious recession that began in the early 1980s. The U.S. Federal Reserve System under Paul Volcker had halted the stagflation crisis of the 1970s by raising interest rates. The increased interest rate sufficiently controlled domestic monetary policy and staved off inflation. By the mid-1970s, Nixon successfully convinced several OPEC countries to trade oil only in USD, and the US would, in return, give them regional military support. This sudden infusion of international demand for dollars gave the USD the infusion it needed in the 1970s. However, a strong dollar is a double edged sword, inducing the Triffin dilemma which, on the one hand, gave more spending power to domestic consumers, companies, and to the US government, and on the other hand, hampered US exports until the value of the dollar re-equilibrated. The U.S. automobile industry was unable to recover.

== Meeting at the Plaza Hotel ==
At the 17 January 1985 G5 meeting attended by James Baker, a small amount of currency intervention to depreciate the dollar was agreed upon and subsequently took place. US intervention was small in those months, but the German authorities intervened heavily to sell dollars in foreign exchange markets in February and March. In April at an OECD meeting, the US announced its potential interest in a meeting between the major industrial countries on the subject of international monetary reform, and preparations for the Plaza meeting began, with preparatory meetings by G5 deputies in July and August. On 22 September 1985, the finance ministers and central bank governors of the United States, France, Germany, Japan and Great Britain met at the Plaza Hotel in New York City and agreed on the announcement that "some further orderly appreciation of the non-dollar currencies is desirable" and they "stand ready to cooperate more closely to encourage this when to do so would be helpful". The following Monday, when the meeting was made public, the dollar fell 4 percent in comparison to the other currencies.

== Effects ==
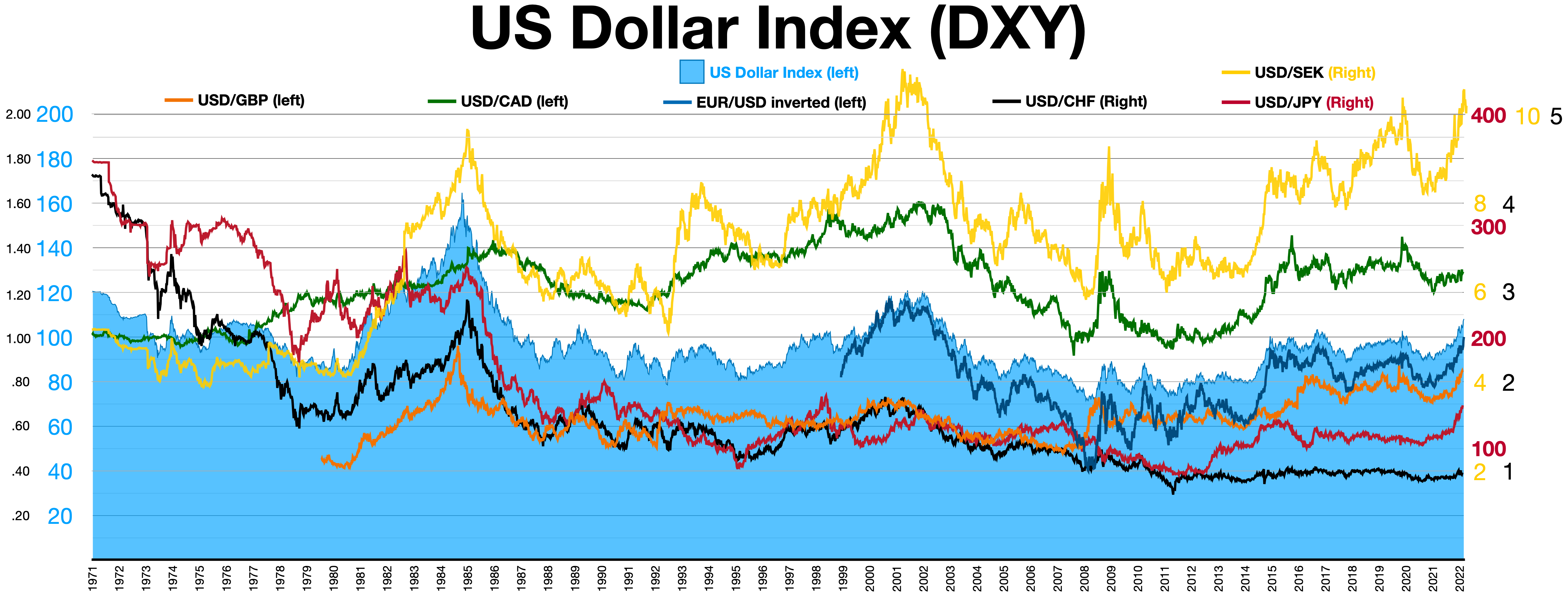
US Dollar Index (DXY) USD/GBP exchange rate USD/Canadian dollar exchange rate EUR/USD (inverted) exchange rate USD/JPY exchange rate USD/SEK exchange rate USD/CHF exchange rate

=== Trade deficit ===
For the first two years after the Accord, the US trade deficit worsened, as rising prices of imports outweighed the decline in import quantity and rise in export quantity in the short run. However, the deficit eventually began to fall, as imports had fallen and exports had risen sufficiently for quantity effects to outweigh the valuation effect.

The devaluation made U.S. exports cheaper to purchase for its trading partners, which in turn allegedly meant that other countries would buy more American-made goods and services. The Plaza Accord failed to help reduce the U.S.–Japan trade deficit, but it did reduce the U.S. deficit with other countries by making U.S. exports more competitive. As a consequence, the US Congress refrained from enacting the protectionist trade barriers which had been called for before the Accord.

=== Successes and failures ===
Joseph E. Gagnon describes the Accord's result being more due to the message that was sent to the financial markets about policy intentions and the implied threat of further dollar sales than actual policies. Intervention was far more pronounced in the opposite direction following the 1987 Louvre Accord, when it was decided to halt the dollar's depreciation.

The Plaza Accord was successful in reducing the U.S. trade deficit with Western European nations, but largely failed to fulfill its primary objective of alleviating the trade deficit with Japan. This deficit was due to structural conditions that were insensitive to monetary policy, specifically trade conditions. American manufactured goods became more competitive in the export market, but were still largely unable to succeed in the Japanese domestic market due to Japan's structural restrictions on imports. The Louvre Accord was signed in 1987 to halt the continuing decline of the U.S. dollar.

Following the Louvre Accord, there have been a few other interventions in the dollar's exchange rate, such as by the first Clinton Administration in 1992–95. However, since then, currency interventions have been few among the G7. In 2000, the European Central Bank supported the over-depreciated euro. The Bank of Japan intervened for the last time in 2011, with the cooperation of the US and others, to dampen the strong appreciation of the yen after the 2011 Tōhoku earthquake and tsunami. In 2013, the G7 members agreed to refrain from foreign exchange intervention. Since then, the US administration has demanded stronger international policies against currency manipulation (to be differentiated from monetary stimulus).

The signing of the Plaza Accord was significant in that it reflected Japan's emergence as a real player in managing the international monetary system. However, the rising yen may also have contributed to recessionary pressures for Japan's economy, to which the Japanese government reacted with massive expansionary monetary and fiscal policies. That stimulus, in combination with other policies, led to the Japanese asset price bubble of the late 1980s. Because of this, some commentators blame the Plaza Accord for the bubble, which, when it burst, led to a protracted period of deflation and low growth in Japan known as the Lost Decade, which has effects still heavily felt in modern Japan. Jeffrey Frankel disagrees on the timing, pointing out that between the 1985–86 years of appreciation of the yen and the 1990s recession came the bubble years of 1987–89, when the exchange rate no longer pushed the yen up. The rising Deutsche Mark also did not lead to an economic bubble or a recession in Germany. Economist Richard Werner says that external pressures such as the accord and the policy of the Ministry of Finance to reduce the official discount rate are insufficient in explaining the actions taken by the Bank of Japan that led to the bubble.

== See also ==
- Currency war
- Dodge Line, yen to dollar equalization efforts, March 7, 1949
- Endaka
- International Monetary and Economic Conferences
- Tripartite Agreement of 1936
