= AYK Radiant =

AYK Radiant is an electric 1/10 scale 4WD Radio Control vehicle made by AYK and distributed by Race Prep starting in 1987. It was followed up by the Radiant Pro which went on to do very well at the National ROAR event in Michigan and the Team Losi Winter Champs in Florida in 1990. There was a Truck Conversion Kit Offered by Race Prep to convert the Pro Version of the Radiant, this kit was based on the truck that won the ROAR Monster Truck National Championships in 1990. The Radiant Pro, driven by Mike Dunn, finished 7th in the 4WD class of the 1989 IFMAR 1:10 Electric Off-Road World Championship.

The saddle pack chassis was made by Bernie.

== Features ==
Features Common to Both Versions

- Double wishbone Suspension Front and Rear
- Chain Drive Four Wheel Drive System
- Adjustable front and rear Differentials
- Aero-Dynamic Racing Wheels
- Adjustable Shock Mounts

Original Radiant Features

- Rear Engine configuration

Radiant PRO Features

- Mid Engine Configuration
- One Way Roller Bearings in the Front Hubs

== Versions ==
- AYK Radiant - 1987
- AYK Radiant Pro - 1989
