= Endaka =

When the value of the Japanese yen is high

Graph of yen versus us dollar over time

Yen real effective exchange rate, peaks are endaka

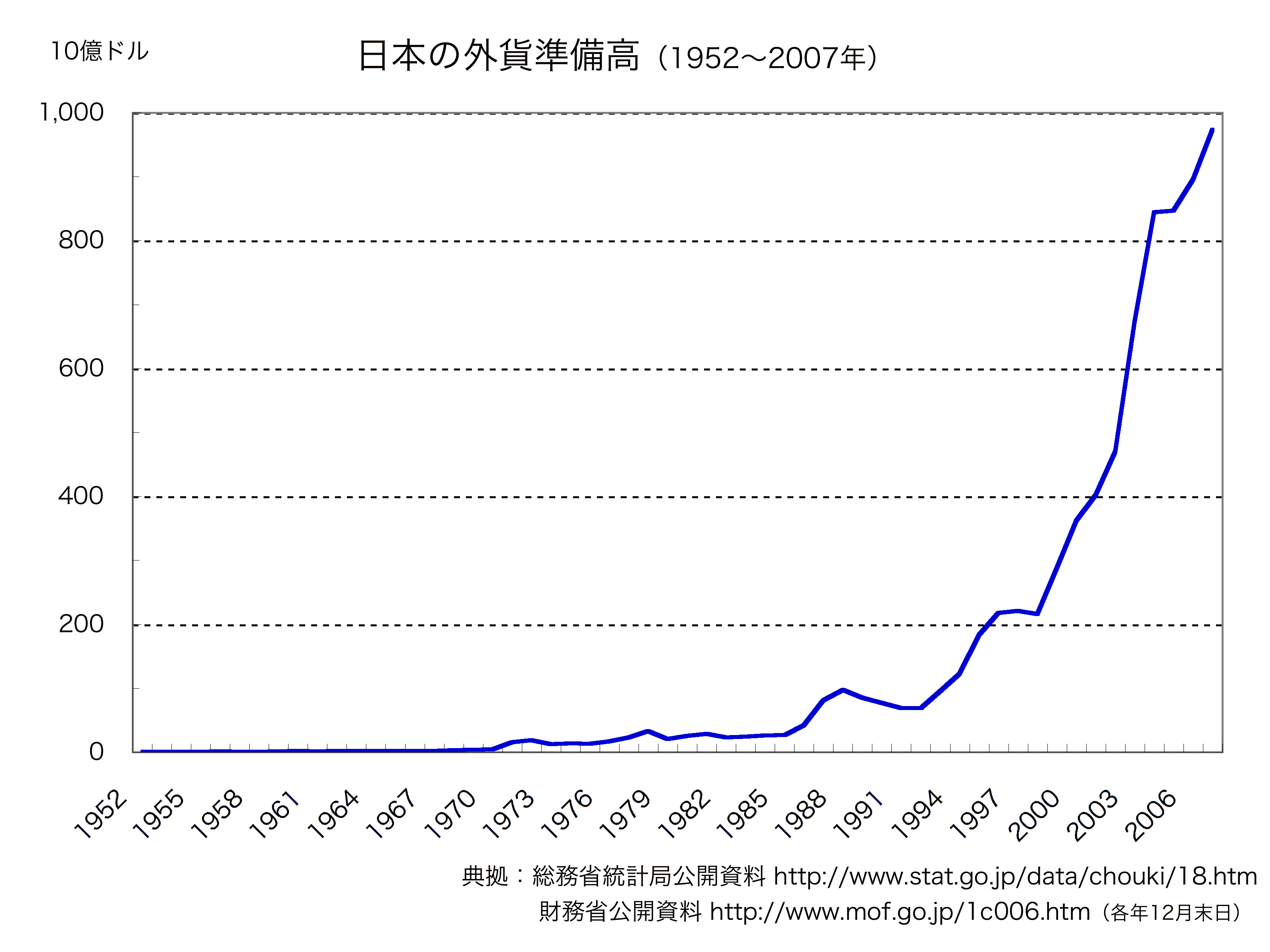
Japanese official foreign currency holdings (1952-2007)

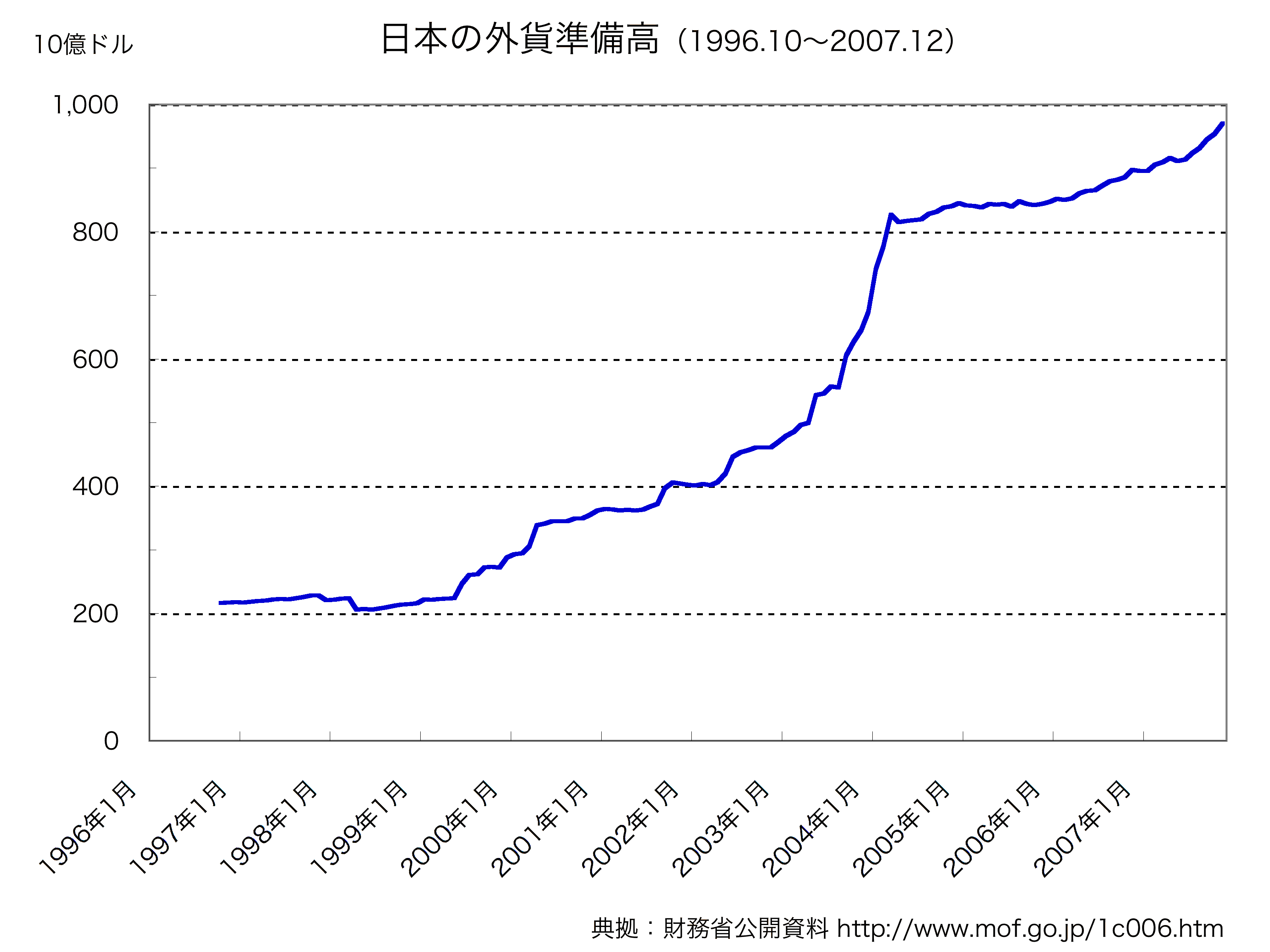
Japanese official foreign currency holdings (1996-2007)

Endaka (Japanese: 円高, lit. yen expensive) or Endaka Fukyo (Japanese: 円高不況, lit. yen expensive recession) is a state in which the value of the Japanese yen is high compared to other currencies. Since the economy of Japan is highly dependent on exports, this can cause Japan to fall into an economic recession.

The opposite of endaka is en'yasu (Japanese: 円安, lit. yen cheap), where the yen is low relative to other currencies.

== History ==
=== Origins ===
The origins of endaka began in 1971 with the Smithsonian Agreement. The term was coined with the first usage in 1985 during the Plaza Accord, in which the yen was revalued sharply overnight. However, its use in the context of recession was first used in 1992, when Japan's economy slowed down, and again in 1995, when the yen hit its then-postwar high of 79 to the dollar.

Japan has struggled to keep its yen low to aid exporters. China, Singapore and Hong Kong typically have a target exchange rate, and they buy foreign currencies to maintain that target rate. However, China, like Japan, has begun to drive itself into a corner with its huge surpluses as well.

After the severe housing crisis bubble burst in 1992, Japan's interest rates sank to near zero. Coupled with gigantic savings accumulated over decades from overseas surpluses, and soaring yen, Japan tried a number of measures to weaken its currency. First it began to buy up properties overseas, such as the Rockefeller Center in New York City in 1990, as well as investing in US corporate bonds. After huge property losses, it gave that up. Another was state intervention BOJ in foreign exchange reserves, which it ultimately gave up in 2004 after accumulating nearly a trillion dollars. Japan also invested directly in Fannie Mae and other mortgage bonds, holding close to a trillion dollars in those bonds. Yet another measure was to loan out hoards of money to US and European banks at zero percent rates, which began in earnest in 2004, also known as the massive carry trade (via yen-denominated bank loans to overseas investors). US and European banks then loaned this money out to home owners in America, as well as big property investors in the Middle East. This effectively kept the yen at 120 or weaker levels to the dollar.

Endaka was tipped off again in 2008. The yen moved from the floating near 120 to floating near 90. This is thought to be the first time endaka contributed to a worldwide recession, instead of just a Japanese recession. While the proximate cause of the recession is widely thought to be an increase in credit defaults (largely outside Japan) causing a loss in confidence in the credit markets (a credit crisis), the yen was funding these investments through the carry trade, where loans were made at near zero interest rates in yen to finance the purchase of non-yen debts which had higher interest rates. As the value of the yen increased, the trillions of dollars' worth of carry trade buildup over years swiftly reversed in a matter of days, and there was pressure to sell these assets to cover the more expensive yen loans, thus decreasing the available credit and accelerating the crisis. By 2011, the yen had touched 81.1129 per USD.

Gary Dorsch of Global Money Trends estimated in 2008 that US$6 trillion (¥610 trillion) was involved in yen carry trade.

Japan saw renewed endaka after the massive 2011 Tohoku earthquake and tsunami, briefly hitting 75.5 to the dollar. Again, after the 2011 U.S. debt ceiling crisis, the yen slowly but surely climbed its way back to after tsunami highs. The yen remains under immense pressure due to accumulated wealth from overseas and a current account surplus, despite a $5–10 billion recurring monthly hit due to imported fossil fuels after a nuclear shutdown.

With China looking to diversify its $3 trillion of foreign exchange into yen, a weakening Japanese yen is limited by Chinese purchases.

== Timeline ==
- 1971: The Smithsonian Agreement revalued the yen from 360 to 308 per dollar.
- 1973–1: The yen was weakened during the energy crisis.
- 1978: The yen was strengthened to 180 per dollar, resulting in the first endaka.
- 1979–1984: yen remained between 200–250 per dollar.
- 1985: The Plaza Accord revalued the yen from 250 to 160 per dollar.
- 1986–1988: yen further strengthened to 120 per dollar, resulting in the second endaka.
- 1989–1995: yen fluctuated between 100 and 160 per dollar.
- 1995: yen surged to a then-postwar high of 79 per dollar, resulting in endaka fukyo.
- 1997: Asian financial crisis, yen fell to 147 per dollar.
- 1997–2004: The Bank of Japan fights yen appreciation, surging foreign exchange reserves, ballooning national debt and the endaka fukyo.
- 2004: The Bank of Japan abandons active intervention, promotes yen carry trades.
- August 2008: The yen strengthened on oil collapse. This sets off a carry trade reversal which cut $5.9 trillion of yen carry and $1.2 trillion of yen loans (7.1 trillion USD), adding to a severe international credit crunch which led to the 2008 financial crisis.
- 2010: The euro area crisis caused the yen to rise to a nine-year high against the euro, rising up to 107 per euro.
- 2022: The yen weakens to 145 per dollar, prompting intervention by the Bank of Japan to stabilize exchange rates.

== See also ==
- Carry (investment)
