= Ayk Kazaryan =

Russian footballer

Personal information
- Full name: Ayk Tigranovich Kazaryan
- Date of birth: 18 July 1993 (age 33)
- Height: 1.94 m (6 ft 4 1/2 in)
- Position: Forward

Youth career
- –2007: Moskvich Moscow
- 2007–2010: PFC CSKA Moscow
- 2011: Yunost Moskvy-FShM Moscow

Senior career*
Years	Team	Apps	(Gls)
2014–2015	FC Solyaris Moscow	28	(9)
2015	FC Torpedo Armavir	2	(0)
2016–2018	FC Kotelniki		
- * Club domestic league appearances and goals

Ayk Tigranovich Kazaryan (Russian: Айк Тигранович Казарян; born 18 July 1993) is a Russian former football player.

== Club career ==
He made his professional debut in the Russian Professional Football League for FC Solyaris Moscow on 12 July 2014 in a game against FC Dnepr Smolensk.

He made his Russian Football National League debut for FC Torpedo Armavir on 20 July 2015 in a game against FC Arsenal Tula.
