= Japanese asset price bubble =

Economic bubble in Japan from 1986 to 1991

The Japanese asset price bubble (バブル景気, baburu keiki; lit. 'bubble economy') was an economic bubble in Japan from 1986 to 1991 in which real estate and stock market prices were greatly inflated. In early 1992, this price bubble burst and the country's economy stagnated. The bubble was characterized by rapid acceleration of asset prices and overheated economic activity, as well as an uncontrolled money supply and credit expansion. More specifically, over-confidence and speculation regarding asset and stock prices were associated with financial policy deemed to exacerbate them. Through the creation of economic policies that cultivated the marketability of assets, eased the access to credit, and encouraged speculation, the Japanese government started a prolonged and exacerbated Japanese asset price bubble.

By August 1990, the Nikkei stock index had plummeted to half its peak by the time of the fifth monetary tightening by the Bank of Japan (BOJ). By late 1991, other asset prices began to fall. Even though asset prices had visibly collapsed by early 1992, the economy's decline continued for more than a decade. This decline resulted in a huge accumulation of non-performing asset loans (NPL), causing difficulties for many financial institutions. The bursting of the Japanese asset price bubble contributed to what many call the Lost Decade. Japan's average nationwide land prices finally began to increase year-over-year in 2018, with a 0.1% rise over 2017 price levels.

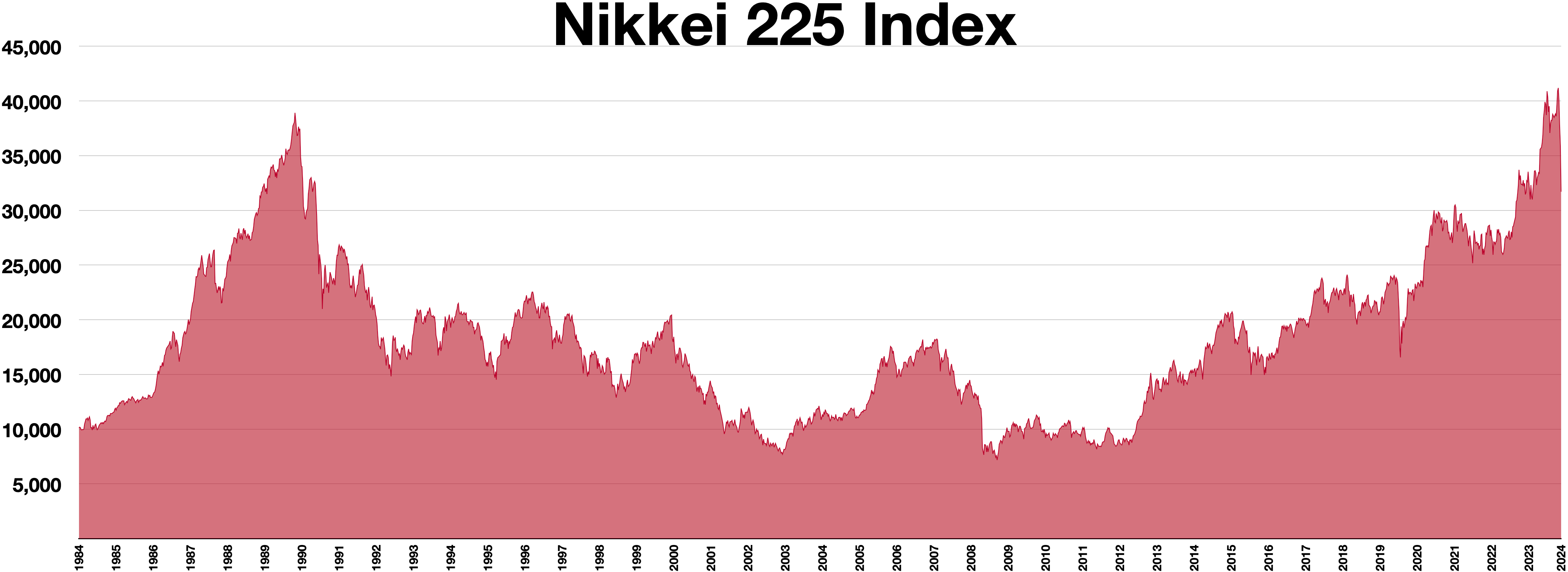
Nikkei 225 Index

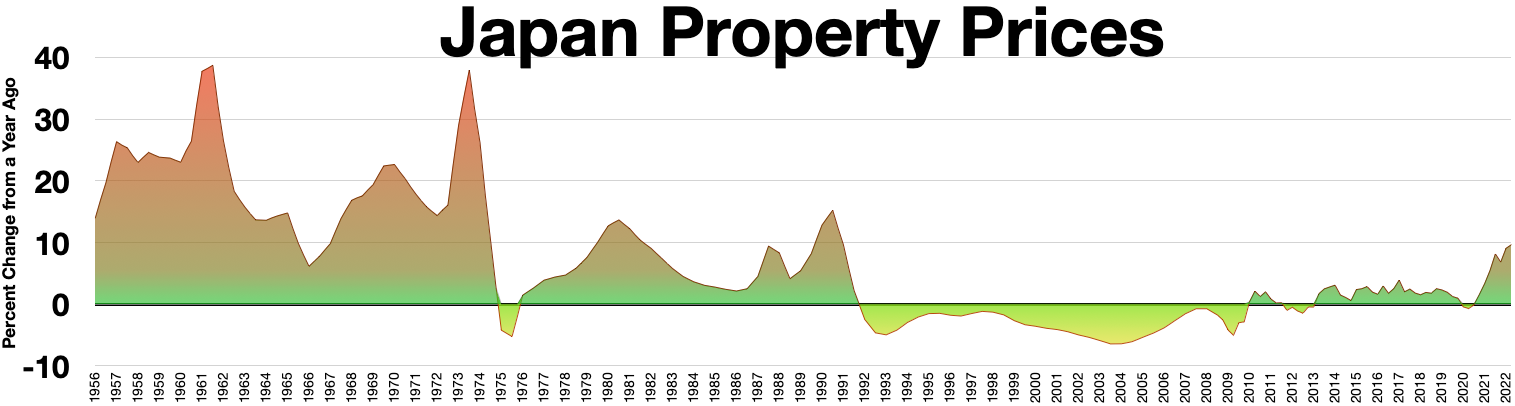
Japan property prices (year over year)

== Background ==
Early research found that the rapid increase in Japanese asset prices was largely due to the delayed action by the BOJ to address the issue. At the end of August 1987, the BOJ signaled the possibility of tightening monetary policy but decided to delay the decision in view of economic uncertainty related to Black Monday of 1987 in the United States.

Later research argued an alternative view: that the BOJ's reluctance to tighten monetary policy was in spite of the fact that the economy went into expansion in the second half of 1987. The Japanese economy had just recovered from the endaka recession (日本の円高不況, Nihon no endakafukyō; lit. "recession caused by the appreciation of Japanese Yen"), which occurred from 1985 to 1986. The endaka recession has been closely linked to the Plaza Accord of September 1985, which led to the strong appreciation of the Japanese yen. The term endaka fukyō would in the future be used repeatedly to describe the many times the yen surged and the economy went into recession, posing a conundrum for business and government, trade partners, and anti-monetary interventionists. Economist Richard Werner says that external pressures—such as the Plaza Accord and the policy of the Ministry of Finance to reduce the official discount rate—are insufficient to explain the actions taken by the Bank of Japan that led to the bubble.

The strong appreciation of the yen eroded the Japanese economy, which was led by exports and capital investment for export purposes. In fact, in order to overcome the endaka recession and stimulate the local economy, an aggressive fiscal policy was adopted, mainly through the expansion of public investment. Simultaneously, the BOJ declared that curbing the yen's appreciation was a national priority. To prevent the yen from appreciating further, monetary policymakers pursued aggressive monetary easing and slashed the official discount rate to as low as 2.5% by February 1987.

The move initially failed to curb further appreciation of the yen, which rose from 200.05 ¥/U$ (first round of monetary easing) to 128.25 ¥/U$ (end of 1987). The course only reversed by the spring of 1988, when the US dollar began to strengthen against the yen. Some researchers have pointed out that "with [the] exception of the first discount rate cut, the subsequent four are heavily influenced by the US: [the] second and the third cut was a joint announcement to cut the discount rate while the fourth and fifth was due to [a] joint statement [of] either Japan-US or the G-7". At this point, the US urged the other countries to raise interest rates, fearing the effects of further depreciation of the dollar on the budget and current account deficit. Almost all discount rate cuts announced by the BOJ explicitly expressed the need to stabilize the foreign exchange rate, rather than to stabilize the domestic economy.

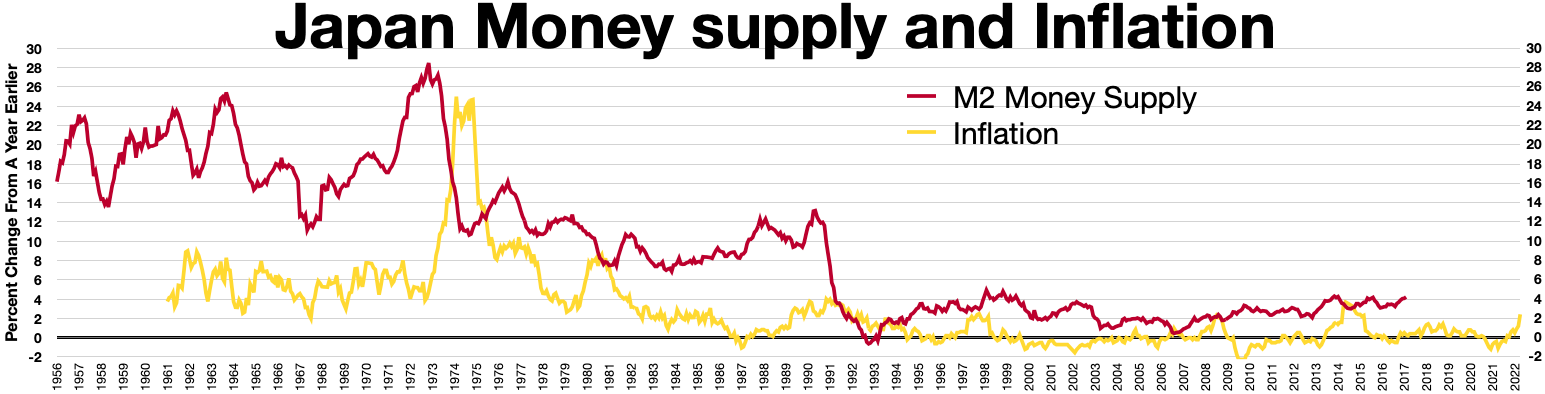
Japan money supply and inflation (year over year) M2 money supply Inflation

Later, BOJ hinted at the possibility of tightening the policy due to inflationary pressures within the domestic economy. Despite leaving the official discount rate unchanged during the summer of 1987, the BOJ expressed concern over excessive monetary easing, particularly after the money supply and asset prices rose sharply. Nonetheless, Black Monday in the US triggered a delay for the BOJ to switch to a monetary tightening policy. The BOJ officially increased the discount rate on March 31, 1989.

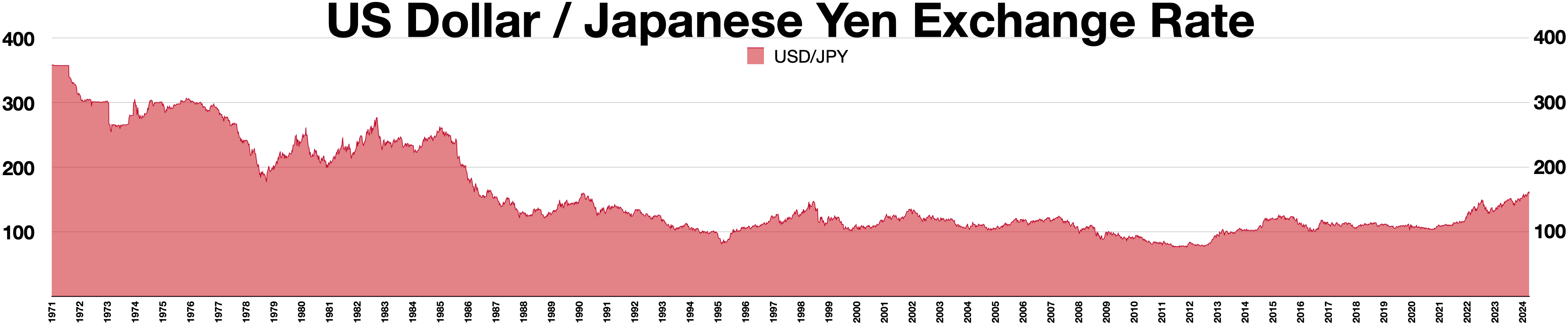
USD/JPY exchange rate 1971–2022

The table below demonstrates the monthly average of the U.S. dollar/Yen spot rate (Yen per USD) at 17:00 JST.

Year	Month											
Year	Jan	Feb	Mar	Apr	May	Jun	Jul	Aug	Sep	Oct	Nov	Dec
1985	254.11	260.34	258.43	251.67	251.57	248.95	241.70	237.20	236.91 ^{[1]}	214.84	203.85	202.75
1986	200.05 ^{[2]}	184.62	178.83 ^{[3]}	175.56 ^{[4]}	166.89	167.82	158.65	154.11	154.78	156.04	162.72 ^{[5]}	162.13
1987	154.48	153.49 ^{[6]}	151.56	142.96	140.47	144.52	150.20	147.57 ^{[7]}	143.03	143.48 ^{[8]}	135.25	128.25
1988	127.44	129.26	127.23	124.88	124.74	127.20	133.10	133.63	134.45	128.85	123.16	123.63
1989	127.24	127.77	130.35	132.01 ^{[9]}	138.40 ^{[10]}	143.92	140.63	141.20	145.06	141.99 ^{[11]}	143.55	143.62 ^{[12]}
1990	145.09	145.54	153.19 ^{[13]}	158.50	153.52	153.78	149.23	147.46 ^{[14],[15]}	138.96	129.73	129.01	133.72
Year	Jan	Feb	Mar	Apr	May	Jun	Jul	Aug	Sep	Oct	Nov	Dec
Year	Month											

#	Remarks
[1]	Plaza Accord on September 22, 1985
[2]	First round monetary easing (January 30, 1986): Official discount rate cut from 5.0% to 4.5%
[3]	Second round monetary easing (March 10, 1986): Official discount rate cut from 4.5% to 4.0% simultaneously with FRB and Bundesbank
[4]	Third round monetary easing (April 21, 1986): Official discount rate cut from 4.0% to 3.5% simultaneously with FRB
[5]	Fourth round monetary easing (November 1, 1986): Official discount rate cut from 3.5% to 3.0%
[6]	Fifth round monetary easing (February 23, 1987): Official discount rate cut from 3.0% to 2.5% in accordance to Louvre Accord (February 22, 1987)
[7]	BOJ signalling possible monetary tightening
[8]	Black Monday (NYSE crash) on October 19, 1987
[9]	Consumption tax introduced
[10]	First round monetary tightening (May 30, 1989): Official discount rate hike from 2.5% to 3.25%
[11]	Second round monetary tightening (October 11, 1989): Official discount rate hike from 3.25% to 3.75%
[12]	Third round monetary tightening (December 25, 1989): Official discount rate hike from 3.75% to 4.25%
[13]	Fourth round monetary tightening (March 20, 1990): Official discount rate hike from 4.25% to 5.25%
[14]	Fifth round monetary tightening (August 30, 1990): Official discount rate from 5.25% to 6.00% due to Gulf Crisis
[15]	Stock price tumbled to half the level of the peak

== Timeline ==
=== 1985 ===
- Plaza Accord ratified in September.
- Japanese yen strengthened from 236.91JPY/USD (September) to 202.75JPY/USD (December).
- "endaka recession" worsened in fourth quarter.
- Nikkei 225 moved above 13,000 by December 12, 1985.
- Sharp spike in land prices within Tokyo metropolis; average land prices (per 1sq. metre) in commercial districts in Tokyo jumped close to 42% compared to the previous years.

=== 1986 ===
- In addressing the appreciation of the Japanese yen, the BOJ began to ease the monetary policy, cutting the official discount rate from 5.0% to 3.0%.
- Japanese yen touched a new high against the US dollar (154.11JPY/USD) in August before settling down at 162.13¥/U$ in December.
- Nikkei 225 strengthened further from 13,024 (January 6, 1986) to 18,821 (December 26, 1986).
- Average land prices (per 1sq. metre) in Tokyo residential areas recorded an increase of 45% (compared to 1985), while average land prices (per 1sq. metre) in Tokyo commercial districts jumped approximately 122% (compared to 1985). Land prices in Tokyo industrial sites jumped about 14% (per 1sq. metre).
- Commercial land prices (per 1sq. metre) in Osaka rose 35% compared to the previous year.

=== 1987 ===
- Japan's economy recovered, and entered into a year of expansion by the first quarter.
- In accordance with the Louvre Accord, BOJ cut the official discount rate from 3.0% to 2.5%.
- BOJ expressed concern over the asset inflation and signaled the possibility of a monetary tightening policy in the summer of 1987.
- Japanese yen continued to be strengthened against US dollar, touching a new high of 128.25JPY/USD by December.
- Nikkei 225 broke the 20,000 level mark by January 30, 1987, and recorded a new high of 26,118 on September 1, 1987. Nikkei 225 slipped back to 21,564 by December 28, 1987, due to economic uncertainties after the Black Monday of NYSE. As land supply within Tokyo metropolis was scarce, investors began to speculate on land around the Greater Tokyo Area, notably Southern Kanto urban land concentrating in Kanagawa (in Yokohama), Saitama and Chiba prefecture. Urban land in Osaka, Kyoto, Aichi (in Nagoya) and Hyogo (in Kobe) prefecture experienced unusual growth in asset inflation.

=== 1988 ===
- Japanese yen strengthened to 123.16JPY/USD by November before weakening slightly to 123.63JPY/USD in December.
- Nikkei 225 broke the 30,000 level mark and recorded a new high of 30,159 on December 28, 1988.
- Asset price growth in Tokyo metropolis began to stagnate, especially in residential areas and commercial districts. Lands in certain wards in Tokyo metropolis began to drop.
- Other urban lands in the Greater Tokyo area remained in an upward trend. Urban land in Osaka, Kyoto, Aichi (in Nagoya) and Hyogo (in Kobe) prefectures was largely unaffected by the situation of the Tokyo counterparts.

=== 1989 ===
- Consumption tax was introduced in Japan in April 1989.
- BOJ tightened monetary policy by hiking the official discount rate from 2.5% to 4.25% by late December 1989.
- Japanese Yen fell against US dollar, falling as low as 145.06JPY/USD by September.
- Nikkei 225 touched a then-historical all-time high of 38,957.44 on December 29, 1989.
- Land prices crashed in Tokyo metropolis as residential land on average 1 sq. metre declined by 4.2%, while land prices in commercial districts and industrial sites in Tokyo metropolis remained stagnant.
- Adjacent prefectures, especially Kanagawa prefecture, also began to be affected due to their geographical proximity to Tokyo metropolis. In Yokohama (Kanagawa), land prices in residential areas were either stagnant or dropped slightly compared to 1988.
- All other major urban lands in Japan remained unaffected by the asset collapse over Tokyo.

=== 1990 ===
- BOJ continued to tighten monetary policy by pushing the official discount rate from 4.25% to 6.00%.
- Japanese yen weakened to as low as 158.50JPY/USD by April but began to strengthen in the second half of 1990; it touched as high as 129.01JPY/USD by November.
- Nikkei 225 dropped sharply from 37,189 (January 4, 1990) to 23,849 (December 28, 1990), losing over 35% in value in 1990.
- Asset prices in the Tokyo metropolis stabilized from moving downwards. All other major urban lands in Japan remained on an upward trend.

=== 1991 ===
- Japanese yen resumed the upward trend against US dollar, strengthening back to 129.07JPY/USD by December.
- Nikkei 225 dropped to 22,984 on December 30, 1991, compared to 23,293 on January 4, 1991.
- Land prices (residential, commercial and industrial sites) in Tokyo fell sharply. All other major urban land prices in Japan grew modestly or were stagnant. Towards the end of the year, most urban land prices fell into negative territory.

=== 2000–2002 ===
- The introduction of the Euro in 1999 led to the normalization of property values across major European capital cities. The Dutch pension manager PVF Achmea, Achmea Global Investors pioneered the novel concept of a global property sector fund as the Euro and US Dollar valuations aided in investment management allocation decisions. Only till late 2000, the Asian and Global lead property securities manager Dhr. O. Silva of Achmea unify all three regions on a relative valuation basis, it was only then evident a tax-efficient property securitization of yielding prime real estate as J-REIT structure could be a practical asset creation model to help stop the decade long asset deflation suffered in Japan.
- In consultation with the leading property developers, Mitsubishi Estate and Mitsui Fudosan, along with Japan's FSA and backed by Dutch pension managers, the first draft of the J-REIT legislature was adopted in November 2000.
- The first J-REIT to list on the Tokyo Stock exchange was Nippon Building Fund (TSE: 8951) sponsored by Mitsui Fudosan (TSE: 8801). As banks and property developers deleveraged their balance sheets, coupled with the liquidity provided by the Dutch pension manager, Tokyo land values for condos and offices stabilized in 2002.

== Identification ==
=== Asset prices ===
The 1985–1991 asset price bubble affected the entire nation, though the differences in the impact depended on three main factors: the size of the city, the geographical distance from Tokyo metropolis and Osaka, and the historical importance of the city in the central government's policy. Cities within prefectures closer to the Tokyo metropolis experienced far greater asset price inflation compared to cities located in prefectures further from the Tokyo metropolis.

For definition purposes, the Japan Real Estate Institute has classified Tokyo metropolis (including 23 special wards), Yokohama (Kanagawa), Nagoya (Aichi), Kyoto (Kyoto), Osaka (Osaka), and Kobe (Hyogo) as the six major cities most impacted by the price bubble. These six major cities experienced far greater asset price inflation compared to other urban land nationwide. By 1991, commercial land prices rose 302.9% compared to 1985, while residential land and industrial land price jumped 180.5% and 162.0%, respectively, compared to 1985. Nationwide, statistics showed that commercial land, residential land, and industrial land prices were up by 80.9%, 51.1%, and 51.7%, respectively.

By the early 1980s, Tokyo was an important commercial city due to a high concentration of international financial corporations and interests. The demand for office space continued to soar as more economic activities flooded Tokyo commercial districts, resulting in demand outstripping supply. The government's policies that concentrated its economic activities in Tokyo, and the lack of diversification of economic activities in other local cities, are also partly to blame for the bubble.

By 1985, land within Tokyo commercial districts was insufficient to fulfill market demand. As a result, land prices in Tokyo commercial districts increased sharply within a year. The average price per 1 sq. meter for land in Tokyo commercial districts in 1984 was 1,333,000¥ (U$5,600 assuming in 1984 that 1 U$=238¥). In just a year, the average price per 1 sq. meter for land in Tokyo commercial districts increased to 1,894,000¥ (U$7,958 assuming in 1985 average 1 U$=238¥). This roughly translates to an increase of 42% over just a year. By 1986, the average price per 1 sq. meter for land in Tokyo commercial districts had risen as high as 4,211,000¥ (U$25,065 assuming 1986 average 1 U$=168¥), a jump of 122% compared to 1985. Residential land jumped from an average 297,000¥/U$1,247 per 1 sq. meter (in 1985) to 431,000¥/U$2,565 per 1 sq. meter (in 1986), an increase of 45%.

Osaka also experienced rapid growth in land prices, especially in commercial districts. Land prices in Osaka gained 35% to a price of 1,159,000¥/1 sq. meter (1986) from an average 855,000¥/1 sq. meter (1985). Since Osaka served primarily as a commercial center in Japan, land prices in Osaka tend to be higher than those of most other urban lands in Japan.

By 1987, due to overwhelming demand, the price of residential land in Tokyo increased to 890,000¥/1 sq. meter (U$6,180 based on the assumption 1U$ = 144¥), and the price of commercial land increased to 6,493,000¥/1 sq. meter (U$45,090). Consequently, investors flocked to prefectures surrounding the Tokyo metropolis, especially prefectures within the Greater Tokyo Area. Investors were more favorable to prefectures located in Southern Kanto than to Northern Kanto. Hence, land in cities like Yokohama (Kanagawa prefecture), Saitama (Saitama prefecture), and Chiba (Chiba prefecture) tended to be more expensive than cities like Mito (Ibaraki prefecture), Utsunomiya (Tochigi prefecture) and Maebashi (Gunma prefecture). For instance, in 1987, commercial land prices in Yokohama (average 1 sq. meter) were 1,279,000¥, Saitama were 658,000¥ and Chiba were 1,230,000¥. On the other hand, commercial land prices in Mito (average 1 sq. meter) were 153,000¥, Utsunomiya were 179,000¥ and Maebashi were 135,000¥ in 1986.

Osaka land prices continued to increase, especially in the commercial area, as the prices increased to 2,025,000¥/1 sq. meter in 1987. Kyoto (Kyoto prefecture) and Kobe (Hyogo prefecture) also saw a sharp increase in land prices, especially in commercial areas that gained 31% and 23%, respectively. The effect of the bubble in Osaka spread as far as Nagoya (Aichi prefecture), which saw the commercial land prices gain as much as 28% compared to 1986.

The first sign of a possible bubble collapse appeared in 1988. By this time, non-prime land prices in Tokyo had reached their peak, though some areas in the Tokyo wards started to fall, albeit by a relatively small percentage. Prime land in Ginza district and areas in Central Tokyo continued to rise. Urban land in other cities at this point remained unaffected by the situation faced by the Tokyo metropolis. In Osaka, for instance, the commercial and residential land prices increased by 37% and 41% respectively.

By 1989, land prices in commercial districts in Tokyo began to stagnate, while land prices in residential areas in Tokyo actually dipped by 4.2% compared to 1988. Land prices in prime areas in Tokyo also peaked around this time; Ginza district was the most expensive, peaking at 30,000,000¥/1 sq. meter (U$218,978 based on assumption 1U$ = 137¥). Yokohama (Kanagawa prefecture) experienced a slowdown due to its location closer to Tokyo. Saitama (Saitama) and Chiba (Chiba) still chalked up healthy gains in land prices. All other urban cities in Japan had yet to see the impact of a slowdown in Tokyo.

At their peak, prices in central Tokyo were such that the 1.15 square kilometer Tokyo Imperial Palace grounds were estimated to be worth more than the entire real estate value of California.

Between 1990 and mid-1991, most urban lands had already reached their peak. The lag effect from the fall of Nikkei 225 pushed down the prices of urban land in most parts of Japan by the end of 1991. The bubble collapse was officially declared in early 1992 – as land prices dropped the most in this period. Tokyo experienced the worst of the catastrophe. Land prices in residential areas on average 1 sq/meter slid 19% while commercial land prices declined 13% compared to 1991. Overall land prices in residential areas and commercial districts in Tokyo fell to the lowest level since 1987.

=== Stock prices ===
Stock trading volumes accounted for by corporations rose from 19% to 39% during the 1980s, while cross ownership rose from 39% in 1950 to 67%. This reduced the number of shares available on the public markets for daily trading, making share prices easier to manipulate and detached from corporate leadership.

In the 1980s, the direction of stock prices in Japan was largely determined by the asset market, particularly land prices, in Japan. Looking at the monthly performance of Nikkei 225 in 1984, the index largely moved within 9900–11,600 range. As land prices in Tokyo began to rise in 1985, the stock market also moved higher. Indeed, the Nikkei 225 managed to rise past 13,000 by December 2, 1985.

The major surge was obvious by 1986, as the Nikkei 225 gained close to 45% within a year. The trend continued throughout 1987 when it touched as high as 26,029 by early August before being dragged down by the NYSE Black Monday. The strong rally throughout 1988 and 1989 helped the Nikkei 225 touch another new record high at 38,957.44 on December 29, 1989, before closing at 38,915.87. This translated to a gain of more than 224% since January 2, 1985. Some researchers concluded the unusual stock prices are likely due to the rise in land prices since the corporations' net assets increases, hence pushing the stock prices upward. As long as the asset prices continued to strengthen, investors would more likely be attracted to speculate on stock prices. However, this also portrays the weaknesses of corporate governance in Japan.

On the downside, the tightening of monetary policy in 1989 seemed to affect stock prices. As lending costs increased drastically, coupled with a major slowdown in land prices in Tokyo, the stock market began to fall sharply in early 1990. The Nikkei 225 slid from an opening of 38,921 (January 4, 1990) to a yearly low of 21,902 (December 5, 1990), which resulted in a loss of more than 43% within a year. Stock prices had officially collapsed by the end of 1990. The downward trend continued through the early 1990s, as the Nikkei 225 opened as low as 14,338 on August 19, 1992.

=== Money supply and credit ===
Initially, the growth of the money supply decelerated in 1986 (the lowest growth rate was 8.3 percent in October–December 1986), which marked the end of the brief "endaka recession". The trend was gradually reversed as it accelerated afterwards and exceeded 10 percent in April–June 1987.

The growth of credit was more conspicuous than that of the money supply. During the bubble period, banks were increasing borrowing activity and at the same time, also financing from capital markets substantially increased against the backdrop of the progress of financial deregulation and the increase of stock prices. As a result, the funding of the corporate and household sectors rapidly increased from around 1988 and recorded a rate of growth close to 14 percent on a year-on-year basis in 1989. Money supply continued to increase even after the BOJ tightened its monetary policy and reached a peak in 1990, thereafter continuing to mark still double-digit growth until the fourth quarter. Money supply and credit dropped sharply by 1991, as bank lending began to drop due to a shift in bank lending attitude.

== Causes ==
=== Plaza Accord ===
The Plaza Accord was signed between Japan, the United Kingdom, France, West Germany, and the United States in 1985, aimed at reducing the imbalance in trade between the countries. At that time, Japan had a huge trade surplus, as the Japanese yen was weaker against U.S. dollar, while the United States suffered from a consistent trade deficit. While originally requested by France, the reason behind the accord was partially complaints by the US regarding the imbalance in the exchange rate between the foreign currencies and the dollar since most foreign products imported in the States had lower prices than the domestic products due to the weaker currencies against the dollar. After reaching a settlement in the Plaza Accord, central banks in participating countries started selling U.S. dollars. In Japan's case, demands for the yen increased, and the yen appreciated significantly. In 1985, the exchange rate of yen per dollar was 238. After the foreign exchange intervention followed by Plaza Accord, the exchange rate dropped to 165 yen per dollar in 1986 as the yen appreciated. This impacted exports in Japan to the States significantly, almost halving them in 1992 from their peak in 1986, whereas the trade deficit in the United States shrank after the Plaza Accord and the deficit cleared out in 1991. Due to the appreciation in the yen, Japanese companies suffered from huge losses in exports, as they had to sell their products in the States at higher prices than before to make a profit.

Appreciation in the yen accelerated more than expected because speculators purchased yen and sold US dollars. This further appreciation in the yen shook the economy in Japan because the main source of economic growth in Japan was its export surplus. The GDP growth rate dropped from 5.2% in 1985 to 3.3% in 1986 and to 4.6% in 1987, and Japan experienced recession. To respond to this, the government shifted its focus on increasing demand within the country so that domestic products and services could still be consumed.

To summarize the effect of the Plaza Accord in the long run, it did not succeed in equalizing the trade imbalance between Japan and the United States. Despite the fact that there was no major change in the exchange rate of the yen and the US dollar, the export surplus in Japan began to rise and the trade deficit in the States started to rise again in the 1990s. Overall, the Plaza Accord directly led to appreciation in the yen, and it incentivized lowering the discount rate in 1986 and 1987, which is considered to be one of the direct causes of the asset price bubble. The rising Deutsche Mark did not lead to an economic bubble or a recession in Germany.

=== Financial liberalization ===
When the United States was in recession in the early 1980s, the U.S. government pointed to the imbalance of exchange rate of the U.S. dollar and Japanese yen as the cause of recession, though the fundamental issue in recession was the fall in competition of domestic producers. To achieve depreciation of the U.S. dollar and appreciation of the Japanese yen, the United States focused on removing financial restrictions in Japan and increasing the demand for the Japanese yen. The financial restrictions in Japan at that time prevented the Japanese yen to be purchased and invested freely outside Japan. In 1983, the United States and Japan committee for Yen and U.S. dollar was established to reduce the friction in the exchange rate of Japanese yen and U.S. dollar. Through this committee, the United States recommended Japan deregulate and ease restrictions on financial and capital transactions. As a result, in 1984, restriction on future exchange transactions was removed in Japan, and it became possible for not only banks but companies to be involved in currency trading. Later in the same year, regulation on converting foreign funds into funds Japanese yen was also eliminated. The abolition of financial restrictions in Japan opened up the Japanese financial market to international trade, and the demand for Japanese yen increased accordingly. At the same time, there was an increasing number of loans from banks to companies for real estate investment purposes in 1985. It partly became the cause of the asset price bubble as financial liberalization increased investment in real estate by companies even before the new monetary policy took hold in 1986.

=== Monetary policy ===
The accelerating growth in terms of Japanese asset prices is closely associated with a significant drop in short-term interest rates, notably between 1986 and 1987. The BoJ had slashed the official discount rate from 5.00% (January 30, 1986) to 2.50% (February 23, 1987). The official discount rate remained unchanged until May 30, 1989.

BOJ official discount rates:

Effective date	Official discount rate
January 30, 1986	5.00% to 4.50%
March 10, 1986	4.50% to 4.00%
April 21, 1986	4.00% to 3.50%
November 1, 1986	3.50% to 3.00%
February 23, 1987	3.00% to 2.50%
February 24, 1987 – May 30, 1989	Unchanged at 2.50%

With the exception of the first discount rate cut, most of the discount cut was closely motivated by international policy to intervene in the foreign exchange market. Despite aggressive monetary easing by BOJ, the US dollar slid as much as 35% from ¥237/U$ (September 1985) to ¥153/U$ (February 1987). Consequently, the move by the BOJ was heavily criticized since such moves appeared to influence the outcome of the yen, a much neglected domestic factor. As a result of such a move, money growth was out of control. In the 1985–1987 period, money growth had been lingering around 8% before being pushed up to more than 10% by the end of 1987. By early 1988, growth had reached about 12% per annum.

The Bank of Japan has also been criticized for its role in fueling the asset bubble. The movement of the BOJ to appreciate the Japanese yen rather than stabilizing the asset price inflation and overheating meant little could be done during the peak of the crisis. Despite the Bank of Japan stepping in to hike the interest rate by May 31, 1989, it seemed to have little effect on the asset inflation. Indeed, land prices continued to rise until the early 1990s.

=== Distortions in the tax system ===
Japan has one of the world's most complicated taxation systems, with its property tax provisions deserving specific mention. These provisions have been widely abused for speculation and have contributed to costlier land, especially within urban areas.

The inheritance tax is very high in Japan, reported to be 75% of the market price for over 500 million yen until 1988, and it is still 70% of the market price for over 2 billion yen. Yet the appraisal of land for tax purposes used to be about one-half of the market value and the debt was considered at face value during the bubble period. In order to evade inheritance tax, many individuals opt to borrow more money for themselves (since the interest rate was far lower), hence reducing exposure to inheritance tax.

Furthermore, given that capital gains on land are not taxed until the time of sale and interest rate payments can be deducted from taxable income for companies and individuals investing in assets (condominiums and offices), this has offered more incentive for wealthy individuals and companies to speculate on the asset price. The Japanese property tax stipulated that the statutory standard property tax stood at 1.4%. However, in terms of effective property tax, it is much lower than the published statutory property tax.

In the 1980s, the local government imposed a tax on the market price of land. Since the valuations did not rise in tandem with the actual rising market price, the effective property tax regressed over time. As a result, the Greater Tokyo Area dropped to 0.06% of the market price. As the land price escalated much quicker than the tax rate, most Japanese considered land as an asset rather than for productive purposes. Strong expectations that land prices were likely to increase, coupled with minimal property taxes, meant it made more sense to speculate on the land price than to fully use the land for production purposes.

=== Land lease law ===
As provided under the Japan Civil Code, the rights of a lessee and tenant are protected under the Land Lease Law. This law can be traced back during World War II, whereby most heads of household were conscripted for military duty, leaving their families in danger of being thrown out off their leased land. For this reason, land leasehold contracts automatically renew unless the landlord provides concrete reasoning to object.

In the event of a dispute between the lessee and tenant, courts may convene a hearing in order to ensure that the rent is "fair and reasonable". If the rent is set by the court, tenants would pay according to the rent set by the court, which meant landlords could not raise the rent more than the actual market price. Hence, rents are actually kept "artificially low" and the market fails to respond according to the rental price set by the market. Due to this, many landlords refused to rent out their land for such steeply discount prices, but rather left the land deserted in order to reap huge capital gains should land prices increase sharply.

=== Changes in bank behaviour ===
Traditionally, the Japanese are well known to be great deposit savers. However, the trend seemed to reverse by the late 1980s as more Japanese opted to shift funding from banks to the capital market – leaving banks in a tight squeeze as lending costs grew with the shrinking customer base.

In fact, bank behaviour has gradually become aggressive since 1983 (even before the monetary easing policy in Japan) after the ban on fund-raising in the securities market was lifted around 1980. However, major firms were not keen to use the bank as the source of funding. For this reason, banks were forced to aggressively promote loans to smaller firms backed by properties. Soon, especially around 1987–1988, banks were even more apt to lend to individuals backed by properties. Evidently, even an ordinary salaryman could easily borrow up to 100 million yen for any purpose, provided his house was used as collateral.

Consequently, this had an adverse impact on the whole Japanese asset bubble. Firstly, cheap and easily available loans reduced the funding costs for the purpose of speculation. Second, stock rises, coupled by low interests rates, reduced the capital costs and aided financing the capital market (e.g. convertible bonds, bonds with warrants, etc.). Third, the combination of a rise in land and stock prices pushed up the value of assets held by corporations, which effectively increased their sources of funding since such these increased the collateral value of the assets.

== Aftermath ==
=== Asset price ===
The asset price burst seemed to exert a strong impact on the overall Japanese economy. By 1992, urban land prices nationwide declined 1.7% from the peak. However, the impact was worse for land in the six major cities, as the average land prices (commercial, residential, and industrial) dropped 15.5% from its peak. Commercial, residential and industrial land prices dropped 15.2%, 17.9%, and 13.1%, respectively.

The entire asset price crisis was far worse, especially in the large business districts of Tokyo. By 2004, prime "A" properties in Tokyo's financial districts had slumped to less than 1 percent of their peak, and Tokyo's residential homes were less than a tenth of their peak, but still managed to be listed as the most expensive in the world until being surpassed in the late 2000s by Moscow and other cities. However, since 2012, Tokyo is once again the world's most expensive city, followed by Osaka with Moscow as number 4. Tens of trillions of dollars of value was wiped out with the combined collapse of the Tokyo stock and real estate markets. Only in 2007 did property prices begin to rise; however, they began to fall in late 2008 due to the 2008 financial crisis.

=== Corruption ===
At the end of the bubble, it was revealed that corruption, which included bribery, insider trading, stock manipulation schemes and fraud, was pervasive in every aspect of Japanese society, from government officials to ordinary people, during the economic bubble.

The Recruit scandal of 1988, in which shares in a human resources firm were offered to politicians in return for favors, implicated the entire cabinet and revealed the close relationship between the government and the private sector.

Nui Onoue, a former restaurant owner in Osaka, was convicted of fraud, and was responsible for the collapse of The Industrial Bank of Japan and Tōyō Shinyo Kinko Bank.

=== Household impact ===
The entire crisis also badly affected direct consumption and investment within Japan. As a result, from a prolonged decline in the asset prices, there was a sharp decline in consumption, which resulted in long term deflation in Japan. The asset price burst also badly affected consumer confidence since a sharp dip reduced household real income.

=== Corporate impact ===
At the same time, since the economy was driven by its high rate of reinvestment, the crash hit the stock market particularly hard. The Nikkei 225 stock market index plunged from a height of 38,915 at the end of December 1989 to 14,309 at the end of August 1992. By 11 March 2003, it plunged to the post-bubble low of 7,862. As investments were increasingly directed out of the country, manufacturers were facing difficulties to uphold their competitive advantage since most manufacturing firms lost some degree of their technological edge. Consequently, Japanese products became less competitive overseas.

During the asset bubble period, most Japanese corporate balance sheets were backed by assets. Hence, the asset prices influenced the corporate balance sheet. Owing to a lack of corporate governance in Japanese companies, most Japanese corporations had an inclination to convince investors with their healthy balance sheet since most investors had a "bullish" market sentiment. An important effect of the bubble collapse was the deterioration of balance sheets. Since asset prices tumbled, increasing liabilities on a long-term basis projected a bad balance sheet to investors. Many Japanese corporations were facing huge difficulties to reduce the debt ratio – resulting reluctance from the private sector to increase investments.

The government continued to provide support for failing banks and unprofitable businesses, making it impossible for more efficient firms to compete. Through sham loan restructurings, large Japanese banks provided a stream of credit to otherwise insolvent borrowers. The term "zombie company" was coined to describe Japanese companies that were unable to cover their debt servicing costs from current profits over an extended period of time. Zombie companies reduce the profits for competitive firms, depress job creation, lower productivity and discourage investments.

During the 1970s and 1980s, life-time employment schemes were widespread, but in a response to the recession that followed the bursting of the bubble, Japanese companies restructured their businesses, which included downsizing and outsourcing. Life-time employment schemes were modified and uncommon, and new college graduates failed to find stable jobs, resorting to unstable and poorly paid jobs.

=== Financial and banking sector ===
The easily obtainable credit that helped create and engorge the real estate bubble continued to be a problem for several years, and as late as 1997, banks were still making loans that had a low probability of being repaid. Loan officers and investment staff had a hard time finding anything to invest in that had the prospect of returning a profit. They would sometimes resort to depositing their block of investment cash, as ordinary deposits, in a competing bank, which would bring complaints from that bank's loan officers and investment staff. Correcting the credit problem became even more difficult as the government began to subsidize failing banks and businesses, creating many so-called "zombie businesses". Eventually, a carry trade developed in which money was borrowed from Japan, invested for returns elsewhere, and then the Japanese were paid back, with a nice profit for the trader.

The post-bubble crisis also claimed several victims such as Sanyo Securities Co., Hokkaido Takushoku Bank, and Yamaichi Securities Co. in November 1997. By October 1998, the failure of the Long-Term Credit Bank of Japan as well as Nippon Credit Bank in December the same year worsened the financial system unrest, drastically deteriorating consumer and business sentiment and dealing a heavy blow to the economy. To address the crisis, the government injected a total of 9.3 trillion yen in public funds into major banks in March 1998 and March 1999.

=== Lost Decades ===
The decade beyond 1991 is known as the Lost Decade (失われた十年, ushinawareta jūnen; lit. "lost decade") in Japan, due to the gradual effect of the asset bubble collapse and effects. The Lost Decade eventually became the ‘lost 20 years,’ since Japanese GDP in 2017 was only 2.6% higher than it had been in 1997, with an annualized growth rate of 0.13%.

== Government policy ==
=== Government spending ===
During a few years after the bubble crisis, Japan experienced a sharp decline in the GDP growth rate. In 1993, the Japanese government decided on a major increase in government spending. It was aimed to increase domestic demand and stimulate consumption to help pull the economy from recession. However, increasing government spending did not turn as effective as the government predicted it to be. The consumption in households increased in 1993 compared to the previous year and continued increasing for several years, but it started declining again in 1998. It is considered that consumer confidence was at the lowest from uncertainty in the future after the bubble crisis, and consumers preferred to save rather than to spend in such a situation. The budget deficit expanded from increased government spending and decreased tax revenue from the recession.

=== Zero interest-rate policy ===
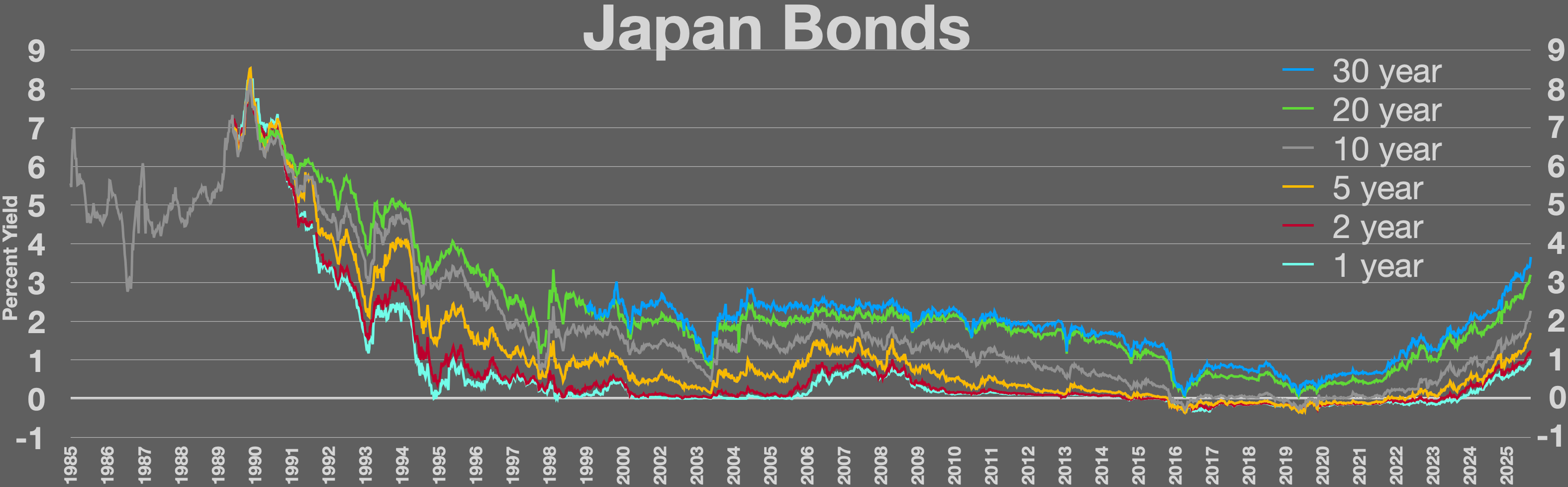
Japan bonds Inverted yield curve in 1990 Zero interest-rate policy starting in 1999 Negative interest policy started in 2016 30 year 20 year 10 year 5 year 2 year 1 year

The central bank imposed a zero-interest policy in the late 1990s to get the economy out of recession after the bubble crisis. The nominal interest rate was reduced from 2% to 0.5% in 1995. Consecutively, the central bank reduced the interest rate to 0.32% and to 0.05% in 1998 and 1999 respectively. It is called the zero-interest policy as the central bank lowered the interest rate as close to 0% as possible. The objective of zero interest rate was to stimulate the economy by making it easier for companies to borrow funds from banks and helping them make investments. As the GDP growth rate recovered back to 3% in 2000 first time after 1996, the government perceived it as the beginning of recovery from recession and stopped the zero interest rate policy by raising the interest rate to 1%. However, the GDP growth rate again tanked to 0.5% the next year in 2001, and the central bank ended up reducing the interest rate again to 0.35% in 2001. Overall, the depression after the bubble crisis was longer than expected. In addition, the uncertainty about the future of the economy was high during the recession, and therefore, lowering the interest rate was not so effective in stimulating investment and the economy overall at that time. The government took the policy of quantitative easing, in 2001. They expanded the maximum amount of deposits in the central bank and lowered the call rate between banks nearly to zero. This marked a better policy for recovering the economy. The economy recovered slowly after 2001, and the quantitative easing was stopped in 2006.
