= List of monetary reformers =

Monetary reformers are economists, politicians, and activists who seek fundamental changes to monetary systems, banking practices, or currency policies. Throughout history, these individuals and movements have challenged conventional banking and monetary theories, proposing alternative approaches to money creation and financial regulation. Monetary reform movements have historically gained increased attention during economic crises and periods of financial instability.

This article lists individuals and organizations associated with monetary reform movements, including historical figures, contemporary economists, and advocacy groups.

== History ==
=== Early monetary reform movements ===
Early American economic thought contributed to monetary reform movements. Benjamin Franklin advocated for colonial paper money and wrote extensively on monetary policy, arguing that properly managed paper currency could stimulate economic growth without the constraints of gold and silver. During the American Civil War, Abraham Lincoln issued greenback currency to finance government operations without borrowing from private banks, establishing a precedent for government money creation that would influence later reformers.

The late 19th and early 20th centuries saw increased monetary reform activism during periods of economic instability. Jacob Coxey led a march on Washington demanding public works programs funded by government-issued money, while the Populist movement advocated for silver monetization to address deflation affecting farmers.

=== 20th century developments ===
The Great Depression catalyzed significant monetary reform thinking. C.H. Douglas developed social credit theory in the 1920s, proposing that direct distributions of money to citizens could address underconsumption. This influenced political movements in Canada and New Zealand, with William Aberhart attempting implementation in Alberta.

Post-World War II developments included the emergence of ecological economics, with scholars like Herman Daly connecting monetary systems to environmental sustainability. The creation of the European Union sparked debate about monetary sovereignty, with figures like Bernard Lietaer advocating for complementary currencies alongside the Euro.

=== Contemporary resurgence ===
The 2008 financial crisis renewed interest in monetary reform. Organizations like Positive Money gained prominence, advocating for sovereign money creation. The rise of cryptocurrency and central bank digital currencies has introduced new dimensions to monetary reform debates, while climate change has elevated ecological approaches to monetary policy.

== Core concepts ==
=== Fractional-reserve banking critique ===
Many monetary reformers critique fractional-reserve banking, which they argue allows banks to create money through lending practices. Reformers argue this system allows commercial banks to "create money out of thin air" through lending, concentrating monetary control in private institutions. The Bank of England explained the mechanics of modern banking, stating that "rather than banks lending out deposits that are placed with them, the act of lending creates deposits – the reverse of the sequence typically described in textbooks".

=== Monetary sovereignty ===
Many reformers emphasize monetary sovereignty – the idea that governments should control money creation rather than delegating this power to private banks. This connects to chartalist theories suggesting that money derives value from government acceptance for tax payments, not from intrinsic commodity value.

=== Alternative approaches ===
Reformers propose various alternatives:

- Full-reserve banking: Requiring banks to hold 100% reserves against deposits
- Sovereign money: Government-issued currency replacing bank-created money
- Complementary currencies: Local or specialized currencies operating alongside national money
- Demurrage currency: Money that loses value over time to encourage circulation
- Social credit: Periodic distributions of purchasing power to address systemic underconsumption

== Schools of thought ==
Monetary reformers may belong to various heterodox economics schools.

=== Institutional economics ===
Institutional economists focus on monetary systems as social institutions requiring democratic oversight. They emphasize monetary sovereignty and the role of money in power relationships.

- Michael Hudson - Critic of finance capitalism and advocate for debt jubilees
- Joseph Huber - German economist and sovereign money advocate
- Dennis Kucinich - American politician who proposed the NEED Act
- Stephen Zarlenga - Founder of the American Monetary Institute
- James Robertson - Co-founder of the New Economics Foundation

=== Social credit ===
Social credit theory, developed by C.H. Douglas, applies engineering principles to economics, arguing that chronic underconsumption requires broader money distribution to maintain purchasing power.

Notable advocates:

- William Aberhart - Premier of Alberta who attempted social credit implementation
- John Hargrave - Founder of the Green Shirt Movement in Britain
- Robert A. Heinlein - Science fiction writer who incorporated social credit concepts into his works

=== Ecological economics ===
Ecological economists integrate environmental sustainability concerns with economic theory.

- Herman Daly - American ecological economist who advocates for steady-state economics
- Richard Douthwaite - British-born economist in Ireland who wrote The Ecology of Money
- Margrit Kennedy - German ecological architect who studied local currency systems
- Bernard Lietaer - Belgian central banker who designed the Euro's convergence mechanism and later advocated for complementary currencies

=== Complementary currencies ===
Complementary currency advocates focus on local or decentralized monetary systems.

- Silvio Gesell - German-Argentine economist who proposed demurrage currency to encourage circulation rather than hoarding
- Thomas H. Greco, Jr. - American writer who advocates for local currencies
- E.C. Riegel - American monetary theorist who promoted private money systems
- Richard Werner - German economist who coined the term "quantitative easing" and advocates for local public banking

=== Austrian school ===
See more in List of Austrian-school economists

Austrian school economists commonly advocate for minimal government intervention while supporting full-reserve banking or a return to the gold standard.

Key figures:

- Ludwig von Mises - Developed Austrian monetary theory and business cycle analysis
- Friedrich Hayek - Nobel laureate who proposed competing private currencies
- Murray Rothbard - American libertarian economist who promoted full-reserve banking and criticized central banking
- Ron Paul - American politician who advocated for returning to the gold standard
- Javier Milei - Argentine President implementing Austrian-influenced monetary policies

== Notable organizations ==
=== International ===
International Movement for Monetary Reform - Global network of monetary reform advocacy organizations

=== Regional organizations ===
==== Europe ====
- Positive Money Europe - Pan-European advocacy organization
- Ons Geld (Netherlands) - Dutch monetary reform organization
- Positive Money (United Kingdom) - British advocacy group
- Monetary Modernisation association (Switzerland) - Swiss sovereign money advocates

==== North America ====
- American Monetary Institute (United States) - Research and advocacy organization
- Committee on Monetary and Economic Reform (Canada) - Canadian monetary reform organization

== See also ==
- Monetary reform
- Money creation
- Credit theory of money
- Money as Debt
- Criticism of fractional-reserve banking
- Criticism of the Federal Reserve
- Sovereign Money Initiative
- Adair Turner, Baron Turner of Ecchinswell
- List of Post-Keynesian economists
