= Monetary system =

Government management of money

A monetary system is a system where a government manages money in a country's economy. Modern monetary systems usually consist of a national treasury, a mint, central banks and commercial banks.

Choice of monetary system affects inflation rates, trade balances, and exchange rates. Throughout history, countries have used various approaches, including commodity money like gold, representative money backed by precious metals, and modern fiat money backed by government authority.

== Commodity money system ==
A commodity money system is a type of monetary system in which a commodity such as gold or seashells is made the unit of value and physically used as money. The money retains its value because of its physical properties. In some cases, a government may stamp a metal coin with a face, value or mark that indicates its weight or asserts its purity, but the value remains the same even if the coin is melted down.

== Commodity-backed money ==
One step away from commodity money is "commodity-backed money". Many currencies have consisted of bank-issued notes which have no inherent physical value, but which may be exchanged for a precious metal, such as gold. This is known as the gold standard. A silver standard was widespread after the fall of the Byzantine Empire, and lasted until 1935, when it was abandoned by China and Hong Kong.

A 20th-century variation was bimetallism, also called the "double standard", under which both gold and silver were legal tender.

== Fiat money ==
The alternative to a commodity money system is fiat money which is defined by a central bank and government law as legal tender even if it has no intrinsic value. Originally fiat money was paper currency or base metal coinage, but in modern economies it mainly exists as data such as bank balances and records of credit or debit card purchases, and the fraction that exists as notes and coins is relatively small. Money is mostly created by banks when they loan to customers. Put simply, banks lending currency to customers, subject to each bank's regulatory limit, is the principal mode of new deposit creation.

The central bank does not directly fix the amount of currency in circulation. Money creation is primarily accomplished via lending by commercial banks. Borrowers who receive the money created by new lending in turn affect the stock of money, as paying off debts removes money circulating.

Although commercial banks create circulating money via lending, they cannot do so freely without limit. Commercial banks were required to maintain an on-hand reserve of funds equaling a portion of their total deposits banks (Large banks in the United States, for example, had a 10% reserve requirement until eliminated in 2020.) Central banks set interest rates on funds available for commercial banks to borrow short-term from the central bank to meet their reserve requirement. This limits the amount of money the commercial banks are willing to lend, and thus create, as it affects the profitability of lending in a competitive market.

In times of economic distress, central banks can act as a borrower to prompt the creation of new money as well; during quantitative easing they will buy government bonds and mortgage-backed securities.

== Demurrage money ==
Demurrage currency is a type of money that is designed to gradually depreciate in value at a flat constant rate. A demurrage monetary system works similarly to a fiat monetary system, but there are major differences in how money is borrowed, lent, and created.

Under the stamp scrip system proposed by Silvio Gesell, every bill of paper money had a set of 52 printed boxes (4 x 13), and a stamp worth 0.1% of the bill's face value would have to be purchased and stamped onto the bill's boxes each week in order to keep the money valid as legal tender. A central bank would issue the demurrage currency. Since the supply of money would gradually deplete due to demurrage, the central bank would be responsible for monitoring the money supply and printing to replace all the money that disappears due to demurrage. The money printing could create just enough inflation to cancel out the natural deflation of demurrage, thus achieving an inflation target of 0%.

Under a fiat monetary system, inflation effectively works as a hidden tax. Under a demurrage monetary system, currency would have demurrage fees instead of inflation, which would be a more explicit and easier to measure tax on money. In Gesell's proposed system, the individual owners of Freigeld would pay the demurrage fee for the stamps to the government, thus reducing the amount of other taxes that a government would have to collect.

If individuals do not want to pay the demurrage fees, they could deposit their money into a bank. The bank would become responsible for paying for the stamp fees, and the money would retain its full value from the depositor's perspective. Banks would thus be incentivized to loan the money in order to pass the holding expense onto others and avoid paying for the stamps, which would guarantee that plenty of money would be available for lending in the economy. Gesell believed that banks would loan until their interest rates eventually fall to zero. Banks would collect only a small risk premium and an administration fee, without any need to adjust for inflation or deflation.

In some cases, demurrage currencies have been employed as emergency currencies, intended to keep the circular flow of income running throughout the economy during recessions and times of war, due to their faster circulation velocities.

== See also ==
- Bretton Woods system
- Causes of the Great Depression
- Credit theory of money
- Criticism of the Federal Reserve
- Great Contraction
- Imperial minting ordinance
- Imperial minting standard
- International monetary systems
- Modern monetary theory
- Monetarism
- Monetary economics
- Monetary policy
- Monetary sovereignty
- Money creation
- Money supply
- Positive Money - a UK non-profit advocating for money creation to be done by the government for the public good
- Price system
- The Age of Debt Bubbles - book describing bubbles from banking debt money creation
