= 2018 Swiss sovereign-money initiative =

Swiss referendum of June 2018 on money creation ("Sovereign Money Initiative")
- 10 June 2018
- Do you accept the popular initiative "for crisis-safe money: money creation by the National Bank only! (Sovereign Money Initiative)"?
- Website: Official announcement

Results
Choice	Votes	%
Yes	442,387	24.28%
No	1,379,448	75.72%
Yes	24.28%
No	75.72%
Blank (Note: In Switzerland, blank or null votes are counted but not considered valid. Only 'yes' and 'no' votes are considered to calculate the majority. See also the official results of the vote on the sovereign money initiative.)	1.8%
Null	0.4%

The Swiss sovereign money initiative of June 2018, also known as Vollgeld, (Note: In German: Vollgeld-Initiative; in French: Initiative Monnaie Pleine; in Italian: Iniziativa Moneta Intera) (Note: The official title of the referendum is the Swiss federal popular initiative "for crisis-safe money: money creation by the National Bank only! (Sovereign Money Initiative)") was a citizens' (popular) initiative in Switzerland intended to give the Swiss National Bank the sole authority to create money.

On 10 June 2018, the initiative was defeated in the vote, with 76% per cent of voters rejecting it.

== Background and origins ==
=== Theoretical foundation ===
The Sovereign Money Initiative drew theoretical foundations from the "Chicago Plan" developed by University of Chicago economists during the Great Depression. In March 1933, these economists circulated a memorandum proposing radical changes to the American financial system, including eliminating fractional-reserve banking and requiring 100% bank reserves on demand deposits. American economist Irving Fisher further developed these ideas, advocating for what he called "100% Money."

These concepts reemerged following the 2008 financial crisis as economists and activists seeking alternatives to what they considered an inherently unstable banking system. Positive Money helped establish the International Movement for Monetary Reform in 2013, and affiliated organizations developed similar initiatives in multiple countries.

=== Initiative development ===
The Swiss initiative was started by the Monetary Modernisation Association, a non-governmental organization founded in 2011. The association began collecting signatures in June 2014, gathering over 110,000 valid signatures, surpassing federal popular initiative requirements. The initiative was formally submitted to the Federal Chancellery in December 2015.

The Swiss government scheduled the referendum for 10 June 2018, alongside a separate gambling regulation initiative. The timing allowed nearly five months for extensive public debate.

== The proposal ==
=== Core elements ===
The Sovereign Money Initiative proposed three fundamental changes to the Swiss monetary system:

1. A monopoly on money creation: Only the Swiss National Bank would be allowed to create Swiss francs.
2. Full-reserve banking: Commercial bank demand deposits would require 100% reserves, ending the current fractional-reserve practice.
3. Separation of payments and lending: Banks would have to clearly distinguish between payments (fully reserved) and lending and investment (not guaranteed).

=== Proposed mechanisms ===
Under the initiative, the Swiss National Bank would create new money, distributing it through three channels:

- Debt-free spending: Directed to the federal government for public projects
- Citizens dividends: Payments to all Swiss citizens
- Interest-free loans: Lending to commercial banks, extending credit to the economy

Commercial banks would operate as intermediaries between savers and borrowers, no longer creating money through lending. All demand deposits would be fully backed.

=== Constitutional changes ===
The initiative required amending Article 99 of the Federal Constitution, which currently states the Confederation has exclusive right to issue coins and banknotes. The amendment would extend this monopoly to electronic deposits which make up 90% of money in circulation.

== Arguments for and against ==
Proposals for "full-reserve banking", going also by titles such as "debt-free money," have been repeatedly presented to the public and then attacked by both mainstream and heterodox economists who suggest that supporters of such "populist" schemes misunderstand central-bank operations, money creation, and how the banking system works. Russian-born British economist Abba Lerner, in 1943, had advocated that the central bank could start "printing money" to match government deficit-spending "sufficient to achieve and sustain full employment." (Note: "Government should adjust its rates of expenditure and taxation such that total spending in the economy is neither more nor less than that which is sufficient to purchase the full employment level of output at current prices. If this means there is a deficit, greater borrowing, “printing money,” etc., then these things in themselves are neither good nor bad, they are simply the means to the desired ends of full employment and price stability." Lerner (1943))

According to the initiative's supporters, money is created as debt, and comes into existence by debt creation when commercial banks borrow from central banks, and when governments, producers, or consumers borrow from commercial banks. Proponents do not want money creation to be under private control as this constitutes a "subsidy" to the banking sector. They consider money created by the banks to create significantly adverse effects, such as inflation (since "the more money [the banks] issue, the higher their profits"), and amplification of crises (since borrowing occurs pro-cyclically). Furthermore, they claim that bank deposits are not inherently safe.

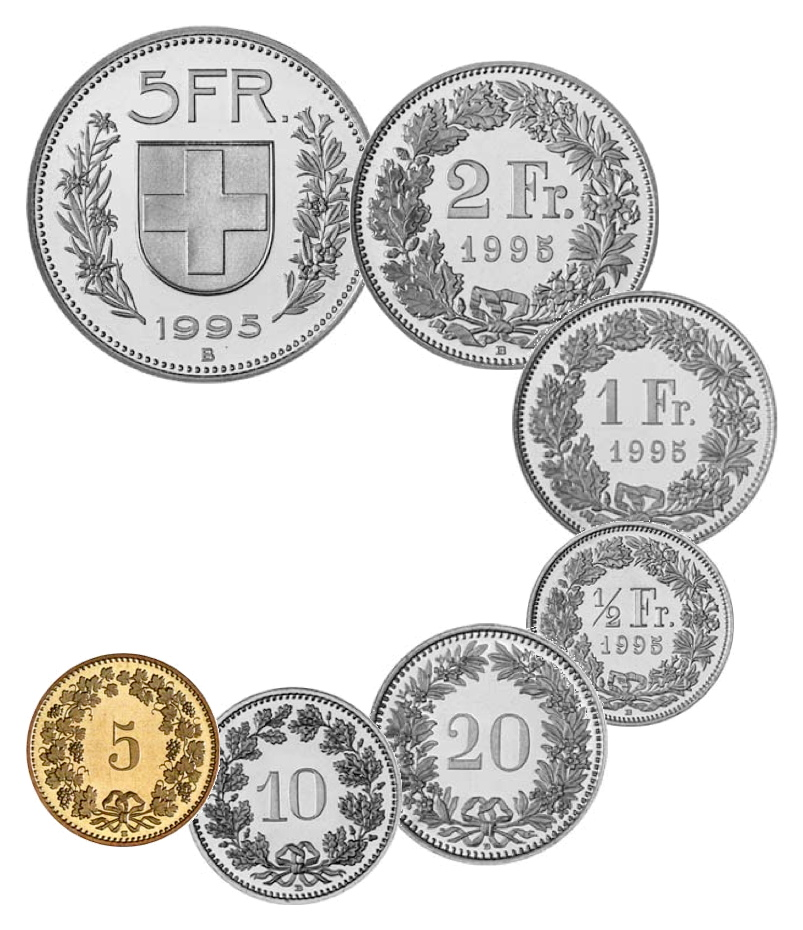
The coins of the Swiss franc.

== Reactions to the proposal ==
The Swiss National Bank opposed the initiative. The Swiss National Bank chairman, Thomas Jordan, warned that "Acceptance of the initiative would plunge the Swiss economy into a period of extreme uncertainty" because "Switzerland would have an untested financial system that would differ fundamentally from that of any other country". The Deutsche Bundesbank does not support the initiative.

In 2016, The Economist commented that the Sovereign Money Initiative "system would be safer for depositors" but that "a huge part of the Swiss economy, would be turned inside-out, with unpredictable but probably expensive consequences." Global Finance described the Sovereign Money Initiative as "challenging the current worldwide norm".

In June 2018, Financial Times associate editor and chief economics commentator Martin Wolf urged his readers to vote in favour of the Swiss initiative, stating that existing bank regulation and bank balance sheets would not be sufficient to prevent a major future crisis. Economist L. Randall Wray has argued repeatedly on what he sees as the "foolishness" of policy proposals like the Vollgeld initiative. Writer and blogger Tim Worstall believed the initiative itself is ostensibly "driven by ill-informed loons."

== Result ==
On 10 June 2018, the Swiss rejected in a "landslide" of approximately 75% of negative votes the proposal of the sovereign-money project.

== Historical precedents ==
The objective of the Swiss sovereign money initiative of June 2018 was essentially to "end fractional reserve banking." The specific initiative in Switzerland was part of the so-called "International Movement for Monetary Reform," created by the lobbying organisation Positive Money in 2013. The idea of requiring banks’ loans to be fully backed by deposits, according to them, has its roots in the Great Depression.

The Vollgeld initiative's monetary reform ideas had already been the subject of a federal legislation proposal in the United States through U.S. Congressman Dennis Kucinich. In 2011, Positive Money and the American Monetary Institute backed Kucinich's attempt to introduce the National Emergency Employment Defense Act, a bill of legislation that would assign the authority for money creation exclusively to the U.S. Treasury, (Note: In the words of the bill: "to restore the authority to create money to a Monetary Authority within the Department of the Treasury") thus ending fractional banking. The proposal did not make it to the floor.

In 2015, Iceland's Prime Minister Sigmundur Davíð Gunnlaugsson commissioned a study for monetary and banking reform. Frosti Sigurjónsson, economist and MP, published his findings and recommendations the same year, in which the abolition of fractional banking, among other things, was proposed. Economist Bill Mitchell criticized the Icelandic scheme, on the grounds that, as he stated, even if implemented, "essentially the money supply would still be endogenous," unless the country's central bank would be willing to "tolerate the interest rate going beyond its control" or witness "a lack of funds available for borrowing." Mitchell argued that the cause of the crisis in Iceland was not the "credit-creation capacity of the banks" but other factors, such as "banks speculating in foreign-currency debt & assets"; banks "no longer behaving like banks"; the owners of the specific banks "engaging in devious and self-serving" actions; and "lack of prudential control."

The same year, the “Ons Geld” ("Our Money") organization that supports "sovereign monetary reform" in the Netherlands mounted a citizen's initiative that resulted in parliamentary debate and the decision to have the government think tank Scientific Council for Government Policy study the proposal to have fractional banking outlawed and “money creation returned to public hands”.

== See also ==
- The Chicago Plan Revisited
- Monetary reform
- Monetary sovereignty
- Money creation
- Politics of Switzerland
- Swiss gold reserves referendum, 2014
