= Drone money =

Drone money is a concept describing a type of digital currency enriched with smart contracts. It is a monetary tool that helps increase the effectiveness of a particular monetary policy by providing a stronger and fairer transmission of such a policy. The currency is issued by a central bank or a private issuer who does so to increase the purchasing power of individuals and households.

Drone money takes the concept of helicopter money (type of monetary stimulus that injects cash into an economy as if it was thrown out of a helicopter, i.e. unequal distribution; it is used to increase a nation's money supply through more spending, tax cuts, it boosts money supply) and combines it with the instrument of CBDC(central bank digital currency). Drone money utilises the method of even distribution and targets individuals to provide them with an equal sum of money through a dedicated account provided by a single organisation. Each individual is allowed to spend the money as they see fit, putting monetary policy back to the service of the citizens. “In the shorter term, drone money is the crypto version of helicopter money, using new technologies to issue helicopter money. Going beyond the failed transmission channels and distributing basic money directly to households, rather than through banks and financial markets.”

For the first time, the “drone money” concept was implemented in Kyjov (Czechia) in the pilot project Corrency, created by Pepe Rafaj and his company I, Foundation. Corrency was created as a response to COVID-19 national lockdowns to help revive the local economy. The pilot utilised the concept of drone money and combined it with the monetary participation of the citizens. “I wanted to figure out how to take helicopter money and change it to drone money that will be targeted and effectively spent on boosting supply and demand,” said Rafaj.
