= International Movement for Monetary Reform =

The International Movement for Monetary Reform is an umbrella organization for monetary reform organizations with nearly 30 organizations around the world,^{:31} founded in 2013 at the initiative of the British organization Positive Money. Their political goal is to replace the creation of money by bank lending with a system that creates money free of debt and create a banking system that works for the people and for society. IMMR reforms would establish a state and central bank monopoly on money creation and allow interest-free money's use and quantity to be democratically decided. IMMR takes an idealist-pragmatic approach, not just describing a better form of money but aiming to implement it through advocacy as nonviolent peacebuilding.

IMMR affiliated organizations developed sovereign money reform varieties, some country specific. According to IMMR and other reformers, excessive bank power creates instability. The IMMR works with countries to promote a steady-state economy, without "too big to fail" banks. Proponents claim proposals like the Chicago Plan would stabilize the currency and reduce financial damage from boom bust cycles.^{:46}

The governments of United Kingdom, Iceland, the Netherlands, and Switzerland have taken some steps towards monetary reform. European members of IMMR provided perspectives on central bank digital currency design.

== See also ==
- Monetary reform
- Money creation
- Credit theory of money
- Money as Debt
- List of monetary reformers
- Criticisms of fractional reserve banking
