= Full-reserve banking =

Offering of loans exclusively from time deposits

Full-reserve banking (also known as 100% reserve banking) is a system of banking where banks do not lend demand deposits and instead only lend from time deposits. It differs from fractional-reserve banking, in which banks may lend funds on deposit, while fully reserved banks would be required to keep the full amount of each customer's demand deposits in cash, available for immediate withdrawal.

Monetary reforms that included full-reserve banking have been proposed in the past, notably in 1935 by a group of economists, including Irving Fisher, under the so-called "Chicago plan" as a response to the Great Depression. This proposal experienced a resurgence of interest among economists, central bankers, and citizen movements following the 2007-2008 global financial crisis.

== International developments ==
No country in the world requires full-reserve banking.

=== Europe ===
Iceland's legislature considered it in 2015 after the 2008–2011 Icelandic financial crisis.

In a 2018 Swiss ballot initiative, 75% of voters voted against the Sovereign Money Initiative which had full reserve banking as a prominent component of its proposed reform of the Swiss monetary system.

=== Islamic banking ===
For Islamic banking and finance, Mahmoud El-Gamal and Tarek El Diwany criticize conventional finance, with ideas echoing full-reserve banking. Malaysia's Islamic Financial Services Board published research comparing Islamic banking's asset-backed requirements with conventional fractional-reserve systems.

=== Asia ===
In Bhutan, ORO Bank partnered with Finastra to launch what claims to be Asia's first full-reserve online bank.

== Concepts ==
Full-reserve banking requires banks to maintain 100% reserves against demand deposits. This is a significant change from fractional-reserve banking, where only a small percentage of deposits must be on reserve. In sovereign money proposals, the state issues money rather than banks.

=== Basic Principles ===
Full-reserve banking effectively splits banks into two distinct functions, described by Benes and Kumhof (2012) as the "separation of the monetary and credit functions of the banking system."

1. Custody and Transaction Services: Banks hold deposited currency as 100%-reserve deposits, transferable to third parties.
2. Investment Intermediation: Banks would become true intermediaries, transferring from savers to borrowers. Jackson and Dyson (2012) argue this separates transaction accounts and investment accounts.

=== Money Creation ===
In the current system of fractional reserve banking, banks only hold a fraction of their capital against deposits and loans. Banks loans create money from nothing by crediting deposits to customer accounts.

McLeay et al. note that in the current system, "Whenever a bank makes a loan, it simultaneously creates a matching deposit in the borrower's bank account, thereby creating new money." In contrast, Sigurjonsson explains that full-reserve banking, "transfers the power to create money from commercial banks" to the central bank.

This has several implications:

1. Money Supply: Dyson et al. argue that banks would no longer be money creators and so generate less financial instability.
2. Credit Creation: Kay argues for managing maturity mismatch through markets not within financial institutions.

=== Account Types ===
Full-reserve banking proposes two distinct types of accounts, analyzed by Pennacchi (2012).

1. Transaction Accounts
  - 100% backed by reserves
  - Available for immediate withdrawal
  - May charge service fees
  - Cannot be lent
  - Legally separated from other bank activities
2. Investment Accounts
  - Fixed terms for withdrawal
  - Can be used for lending
  - May offer different risk-return profiles
  - Risk explicitly borne by depositor
  - Returns based on investment performance

== History ==
In the 1840s, British Currency School theorists argued for 100% reserves.

In the early 20th century, classical economics was widely accepted. In the 1930s, Keynesianism gained prominence as policymakers sought solutions for the Great Depression.

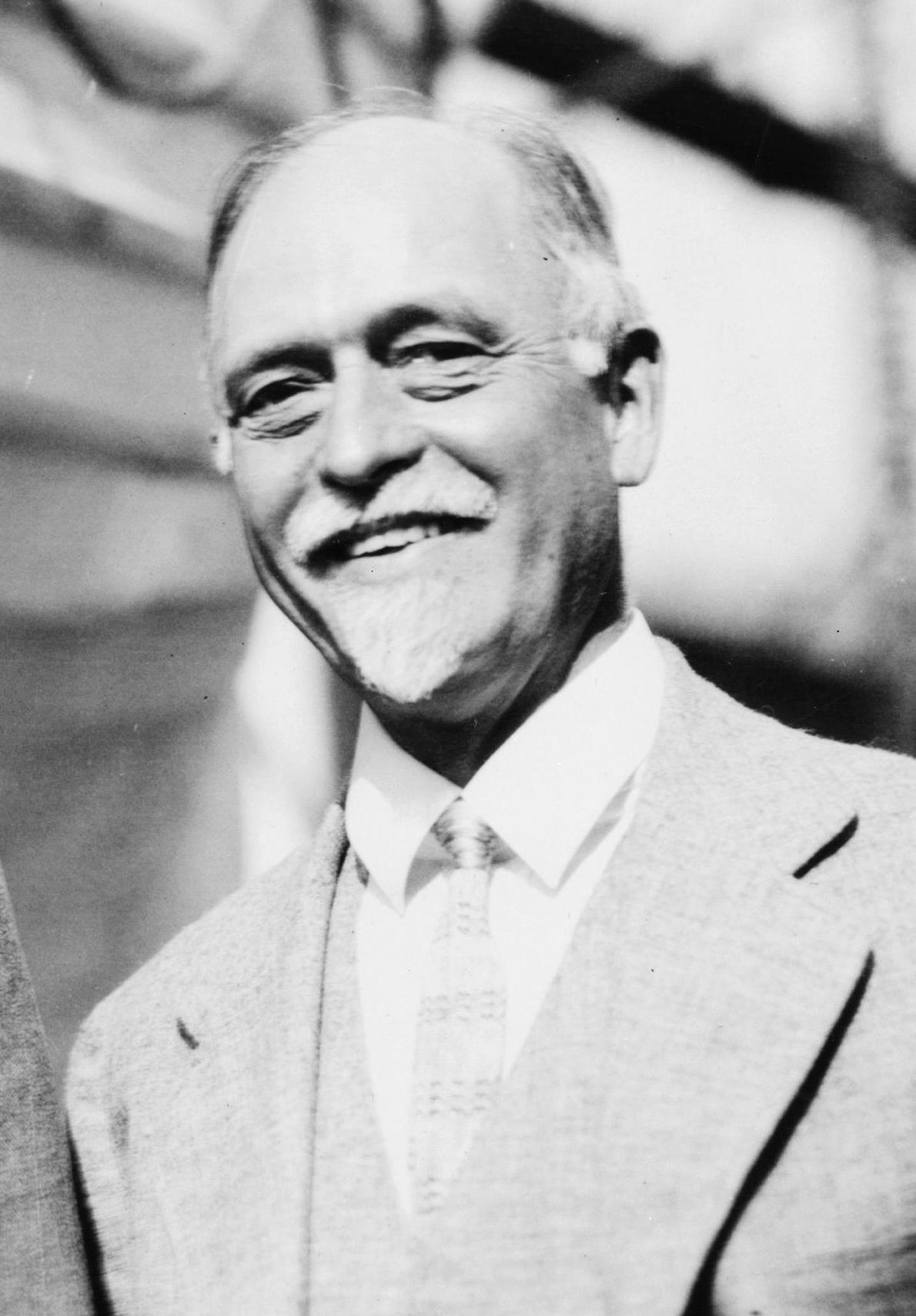
Irving Fisher

Economists proposed various strategies to address financial stability, including the Chicago Plan's full-reserve banking. Irving Fisher's "The Debt-Deflation Theory of Great Depressions" (1933) analyzed how debt cycles contributed to economic instability. Fisher proposed in his 1935 "100% Money" disconnecting money and credit.

Albert G. Hart detailed in 1935 how to maintain economic stability during the transition to 100% reserves. William R. Allen recounted in 1993 how Fisher's proposals influenced banking reform discussions. Full-reserve banking did not become law.

Maurice Allais presented a 100% reserve proposal in a 1948 book. Milton Friedman advocated for 100% reserves in 1960 with A Program for Monetary Stability.

James Tobin proposed a deposit currency system in 1985 with aspects of 100% reserves. Laurence Kotlikoff called for 100% reserve banking in his 2010 book Jimmy Stewart Is Dead.

In the 2014 Money Creation and Society debate in the UK Parliament, Zac Goldsmith called for a monetary commission on full reserve banking.

In December 2025, N3XT inc launched the first full-reserve narrow bank in the U.S.A. after receiving its Special Purpose Depository Institution charter from the State of Wyoming.

== Views ==
=== In favor ===
Economist Milton Friedman at one time advocated a 100% reserve requirement for checking accounts, and economist Laurence Kotlikoff has also called for an end to fractional-reserve banking. Austrian School economist Murray Rothbard has written that reserves of less than 100% constitute fraud on the part of banks and should be illegal, and that full-reserve banking would eliminate the risk of bank runs. Jesús Huerta de Soto, another economist of the Austrian school, has also strongly argued in favor of full-reserve banking and the outlawing of fractional reserve banking.

The 2008 financial crisis led to renewed interest in full reserve banking and sovereign money issued by a central bank. Monetary reformers point out that fractional reserve banking leads to unpayable debt, growing economic inequality, inevitable bankruptcy, and an imperative for perpetual and unsustainable economic growth. Martin Wolf, chief economist at the Financial Times, endorsed full reserve banking, saying "it would bring huge advantages".

Martin Wolf, Chief Economics Commentator at the Financial Times, argues that many people have a fundamentally flawed and oversimplified conception of what it is that banks do. Laurence Kotlikoff and Edward Leamer agree, in a paper entitled "A Banking System We Can Trust", arguing that the current financial system did not produce the benefits that have been attributed to it. Rather than simply borrowing money from savers to make loans towards investment and production, and holding "money" as a stable liability, banks in reality create credit increasingly for the purpose of acquiring existing assets. Rather than financing real productivity and investment, and generating fair asset prices, Wall Street has come to resemble a casino, in which trade volume of securities skyrockets without having positive impacts on the investment rate or economic growth. The credits and debt banks create play a role in determining how delicate the economy is in the face of crisis. For example, Wall Street caused the housing bubble by financing millions of mortgages that were outside budget constraints, which in turn decreased output by 10 percent.

==== Money supply problems ====
In The Mystery of Banking, Murray Rothbard argues that legalized fractional-reserve banking gave banks "carte blanche" to create money out of thin air. Economists that formulated the Chicago Plan following the Great Depression argue that allowing banks to have fractional reserves puts too much power in the hands of banks by allowing them to determine the amount of money in circulation by changing the amount of loans they give out.

==== Fractional-reserve banking fraud issues ====
Deposit bankers become loan bankers when they issue fake warehouse receipts that are not backed by the assets actually held, thus constituting fraud.^{:97} Rothbard likens this practice to counterfeiting, with the loan banker extracting resources from the public. However, Bryan Caplan argues that fractional-reserve banking does not constitute fraud, as by Rothbard's own admission an advertised product must simply meet the "common definition" of that product believed by consumers. Caplan contends that it is part of the common definition of a modern bank to make loans against demand deposits, thus not constituting fraud.

==== Balance sheet fundamentals ====
Furthermore, Rothbard argues that fractional reserve banking is fundamentally unsound because of the timescale of a bank's balance sheet. While a typical firm should have its assets be due prior to the payment date of its liabilities, so that the liabilities can be paid, the fractional reserve deposit bank has its demand deposit liabilities due at any point the depositor chooses, and its assets, being the loans it has made with someone else's deposits, due at some later date.

=== Against ===
==== New fees ====
Some economists have noted that under full-reserve banking, because banks would not earn revenue from lending against demand deposits, depositors would have to pay fees for the services associated with checking accounts. This, it is felt, would probably be rejected by the public. However, in economies where central banks enact zero and negative interest rate policies, some writers have noted depositors are already paying to put their savings in fractional reserve banks.

==== Shadow banking and unregulated institutions ====
In their influential paper on financial crises, economists Douglas W. Diamond and Philip H. Dybvig warned that under full-reserve banking, since banks would only be permitted to lend out funds where depositors agreed to time-lock their deposits, need for extra credit would drive some borrowers to use unregulated institutions. Unregulated institutions (such as high-yield debt issuers) would take over the economically necessary role of financial intermediation and maturity transformation, therefore destabilizing the financial system and leading to more frequent financial crises.

Writing in response to various writers' support for full reserve banking, Paul Krugman stated that the idea was "certainly worth talking about", but worries that it would drive financial activity outside the banking system, into the less regulated shadow banking system.

==== Misses the problem ====
Krugman argues that the 2008 financial crisis was not largely a result of depositors attempting to withdraw deposits from commercial banks, but a large-scale run on shadow banking, especially repo — overnight lending. As financial markets seemed to have recovered more quickly than the 'real economy', Krugman sees the recession more as a result of excess leverage and household balance-sheet issues. Neither of these issues would be addressed by a full-reserve regulation on commercial banks, he claims.

== See also ==
- Austrian business cycle theory
- Chicago plan / The Chicago Plan Revisited
- Committee on Monetary and Economic Reform (Canada)
- Fiat money
- Fractional-reserve banking
- Monetary reform
- List of monetary reformers
- Money creation
- Narrow banking
- Positive Money
- Reserve requirement
- Hard currency
- Seigniorage
- Swiss sovereign money referendum, 2018
- Broad money
