= Money as Debt =

- DVD cover
- Directed by: Paul Grignon
- Written by: Paul Grignon
- Produced by: Paul Grignon
- Narrated by: Bob Bossin
- Music by: Paul Grignon
- Production company: Moonfire Studio
- Release date: 2006
- Running time: 47 minutes
- Country: Canada

Money as Debt is a 2006 animated documentary film by Canadian artist and filmmaker Paul Grignon about the monetary systems practised through modern banking. The film presents Grignon's view of the process of money creation by banks and its historical background, and warns of his belief in its subsequent unsustainability. Subsequent Money as Debt videos include Money as Debt II Promises Unleashed (2009) and Money as Debt III: Evolution Beyond Money (2011).

== Background ==
The film was conceived by Grignon in 2002 as an introduction to a 5-hour video commission for United Financial Consumers. He prefaced his video lecture with a re-telling of The Goldsmith's Tale in animation form titled Money as Debt. The Goldsmith's Tale is noted in the film as being "a brief and broadly allegorical history of banking" and should not be viewed as a complete or entirely accurate account of the history of banking. Expanded over a six-month period in 2006, it was Grignon's first full-length animation project.

Much of the film presents the filmmaker's understanding of modern money creation in a fractional-reserve banking system. New money enters the economy through the indebtedness of borrowers, thus not only obligating the public to the money-issuing private banks but also creating an endless and self-escalating debt that is to eventually outgrow all other forms of wealth generation. The film claims that this ever-increasing gravitation of money to banks is capable of impoverishing any nation. The film finishes by identifying some alternatives to modern banking, such as the nationalization of banks and payment of dividends to the public, establishing local exchange trading systems, or government printing of money.

== Critical response ==
An article in Anthropology Today called the film "a hit in activist circles", but also a "fable" that "demonizes the banks, and interest in particular" and whose "message is in many ways misleading".

An article in the Atlantic Free Press said "Money as Debt is not entertainment—far from it. The film offers amazingly elementary facts about the creation of money in the United States, narrated by a soothing voice, which could make for a bland presentation, yet the film's message is anything but vapid. In fact, if it doesn't leave your blood boiling, it behooves you to check your vital signs."

Cdurable wrote, "This animated feature, dynamic and entertaining, by artist and videographer Paul Grignon, explains the magical but twisted effects of the current system of debt-money in terms understandable to all." Thomas Publications Fog City Journal wrote that the animated documentary was "a painless but hard-hitting educational tool".

On his personal website, Paul Grignon said there were two main criticisms of the documentary, provided counter-arguments, but conceded that his presentation of fractional-reserve banking may have been "misleading" and "in the revised edition will be replaced with less contentious information". The film has also been criticized by other heterodox economic and libertarian thinkers, such as G. Edward Griffin's Freedom Force International. Specifically, Griffin criticizes Grignon's proposal for "interest-free banking" and fiat, albeit government-created as opposed to central bank-created, currency.

== Money as Debt III ==
This film describes the three alternative solutions made by money reformers.

- Hard money, such as the gold standard
- Debt-free fiat money. This saves the need to pay interest on the national debt
- Self-issued credit

== See also ==
- Free banking
