= Central bank =

Government body that manages currency and monetary policy

A central bank, reserve bank, national bank, state bank, or monetary authority is a financial institution that manages the monetary policy of a country or monetary union. In contrast to a commercial bank, a central bank possesses a monopoly on increasing the monetary base. Many central banks also have supervisory or regulatory powers to ensure the stability of commercial banks in their jurisdiction, to prevent bank runs, and, in some cases, to enforce policies on financial consumer protection, and against bank fraud, money laundering, or terrorism financing. Central banks play a crucial role in macroeconomic forecasting, which is essential for guiding monetary policy decisions, especially during times of economic turbulence.

Central banks in most developed nations are usually set up to be institutionally independent from political interference, even though governments typically have governance rights over them, legislative bodies exercise scrutiny, and central banks frequently do show responsiveness to politics.

Issues like central bank independence, central bank policies, and rhetoric in central bank governors' discourse or the premises of macroeconomic policies (monetary and fiscal policy) of the state, are a focus of contention and criticism by some policymakers, researchers, and specialized business, economics, and finance media.

== Definition ==
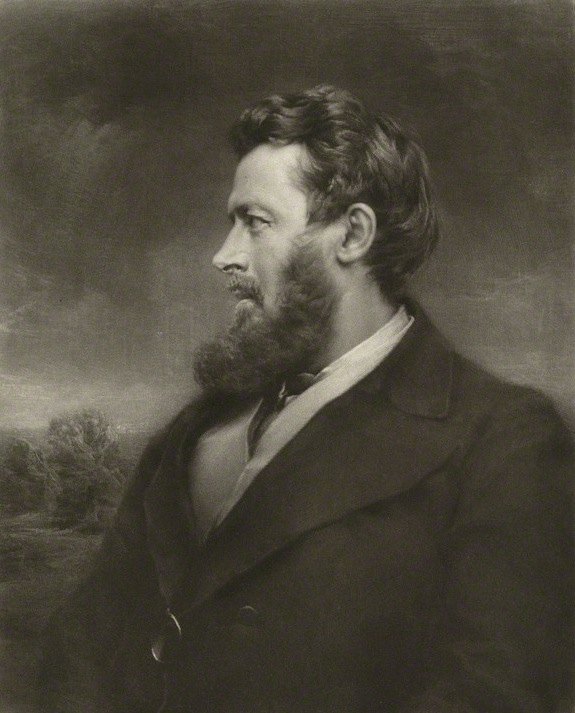
Walter Bagehot, influential 19th-century theorist of the economic role of central banks

The notion of central banks as a separate category from other banks has emerged gradually, and only fully coalesced in the 20th century. In the aftermath of World War I, leading central bankers of the United Kingdom and the United States respectively, Montagu Norman and Benjamin Strong, agreed on a definition of central banks that was both positive and normative. Since that time, central banks have been generally distinguishable from other financial institutions, except under Communism in so-called single-tier banking systems such as Hungary's between 1950 and 1987, where the Hungarian National Bank operated alongside three other major state-owned banks. For earlier periods, what institutions do or do not count as central banks is often ambiguous.

Different scholars have held differing views about the timeline of emergence of the first central banks. A widely held view in the second half of the 20th century has been that Stockholms Banco (est. 1657), as the original issuer of banknotes, counted as the oldest central bank, and that consequently its successor the Sveriges Riksbank was the oldest central bank in continuous operation, with the Bank of England as second-oldest and direct or indirect model for all subsequent central banks. That view has persisted in some early-21st-century publications. In more recent scholarship, however, the issuance of banknotes has often been viewed as just one of several techniques to provide central bank money, defined as financial money (in contrast to commodity money) of the highest quality. Under that definition, municipal banks of the late medieval and early modern periods, such as the Taula de canvi de Barcelona (est. 1401) or Bank of Amsterdam (est. 1609), issued central bank money and count as early central banks.

== Naming ==
There is no universal terminology for the name of a central bank. Early central banks were often the only or principal formal financial institution in their jurisdiction, and were consequently often named "bank of" the relevant city's or country's name, e.g. the Bank of Amsterdam, Bank of Hamburg, Bank of England, or Wiener Stadtbank. Naming practices subsequently evolved as more central banks were established. The expression "central bank" itself only appeared in the early 19th century, but at that time it referred to the head office of a multi-branched bank, and was still used in that sense by Walter Bagehot in his seminal 1873 book Lombard Street. During that era, what is now known as a central bank was often referred to as a bank of issue (French: institut d'émission, German: Notenbank). The reference to central banking in the current sense only became widespread in the early 20th century.

Names of individual central banks include, with references to the date when the bank acquired its current name:

- "Bank of [Country]": e.g. Bank of the United States (1791), Bank of France (1800), Bank of Java (1828), Bank of Japan (1882), Bank of Italy (1893), Bank of China (1912), Bank of Mexico (1925), Bank of Canada (1934), Bank of Korea (1950). The Bank of England has kept its original name of 1694, even though the Act of Union 1707 and Acts of Union 1800 expanded its remit to the broader United Kingdom.
- "National Bank": e.g. National Bank of Belgium (1850), Bulgarian National Bank (1879), Swiss National Bank (1907), National Bank of Poland (1945), National Bank of Ukraine (1991).
- "State Bank": e.g. State Bank of the Russian Empire (1860), State Bank of Pakistan (1948), State Bank of Vietnam (1951); also former central banks of Communist countries, e.g. the State Bank of the USSR (or Gosbank, 1922) or the State Bank of Czechoslovakia (1950). "People's Bank", also associated with Communism, is used by the People's Bank of China.
- "Reserve Bank": in the U.S. Federal Reserve (1913) and thereafter British colonies or dominions, e.g. South African Reserve Bank (1921), Reserve Bank of New Zealand (1934), Reserve Bank of India (1935), Reserve Bank of Australia (1960), Reserve Bank of Fiji (1984)
- "Central Bank": e.g. Central Bank of China (1924), Central Bank of the Republic of Turkey (1930), Central Bank of Argentina (1935), Central Bank of Ireland (1943), Central Bank of Sri Lanka (1950) Central Bank of Paraguay (1952), Central Bank of Brazil (1964), Central Bank of Russia (1990), European Central Bank (1998).
- "Monetary Authority", e.g. Monetary Authority of Singapore (1971), Maldives Monetary Authority (1981), Hong Kong Monetary Authority (1993), Cayman Islands Monetary Authority (1997). The Saudi Arabian Monetary Authority (est. 1952) was renamed the Saudi Central Bank in 2020 but still uses the acronym SAMA.

In some cases, the local-language name is used in English-language practice, e.g. Sveriges Riksbank (est. 1668, current name in use since 1866), De Nederlandsche Bank (est. 1814), Deutsche Bundesbank (est. 1957), or Bangko Sentral ng Pilipinas (est. 1993).

Some commercial banks have names suggestive of central banks, even if they are not: examples are the State Bank of India and Central Bank of India, National Bank of Greece, Banco do Brasil, National Bank of Pakistan, Bank of China, Bank of Cyprus, or Bank of Ireland, as well as Deutsche Bank. Some but not all of these institutions had assumed central banking roles in the past.

The leading executive of a central bank is usually known as the Governor, President, or Chair.

== History ==
The widespread adoption of central banking is a rather recent phenomenon. At the start of the 20th century, approximately two-thirds of sovereign states did not have a central bank. Waves of central bank adoption occurred in the interwar period and in the aftermath of World War II.

In the 20th century, central banks were often created with the intent to attract foreign capital, as bankers preferred to lend to countries with a central bank on the gold standard.

=== Background ===
The use of money as a unit of account predates history. Government control of money is documented in the ancient Egyptian economy (2750–2150 BCE). The Egyptians measured the value of goods with a central unit called shat. Like many other currencies, the shat was linked to gold. The value of a shat in terms of goods was defined by government administrations. Other cultures in Asia Minor later materialized their currencies in the form of gold and silver coins.

The mere issuance of paper currency or other types of financial money by a government is not the same as central banking. The difference is that government-issued financial money, as present e.g. in China during the Yuan dynasty in the form of paper currency, is typically not freely convertible and thus of inferior quality, occasionally leading to hyperinflation.

From the 12th century, a network of professional banks emerged primarily in Southern Europe (including Southern France, with the Cahorsins). Banks could use book money to create deposits for their customers. Thus, they had the possibility to issue, lend and transfer money autonomously without direct control from political authorities.

=== Early municipal central banks ===
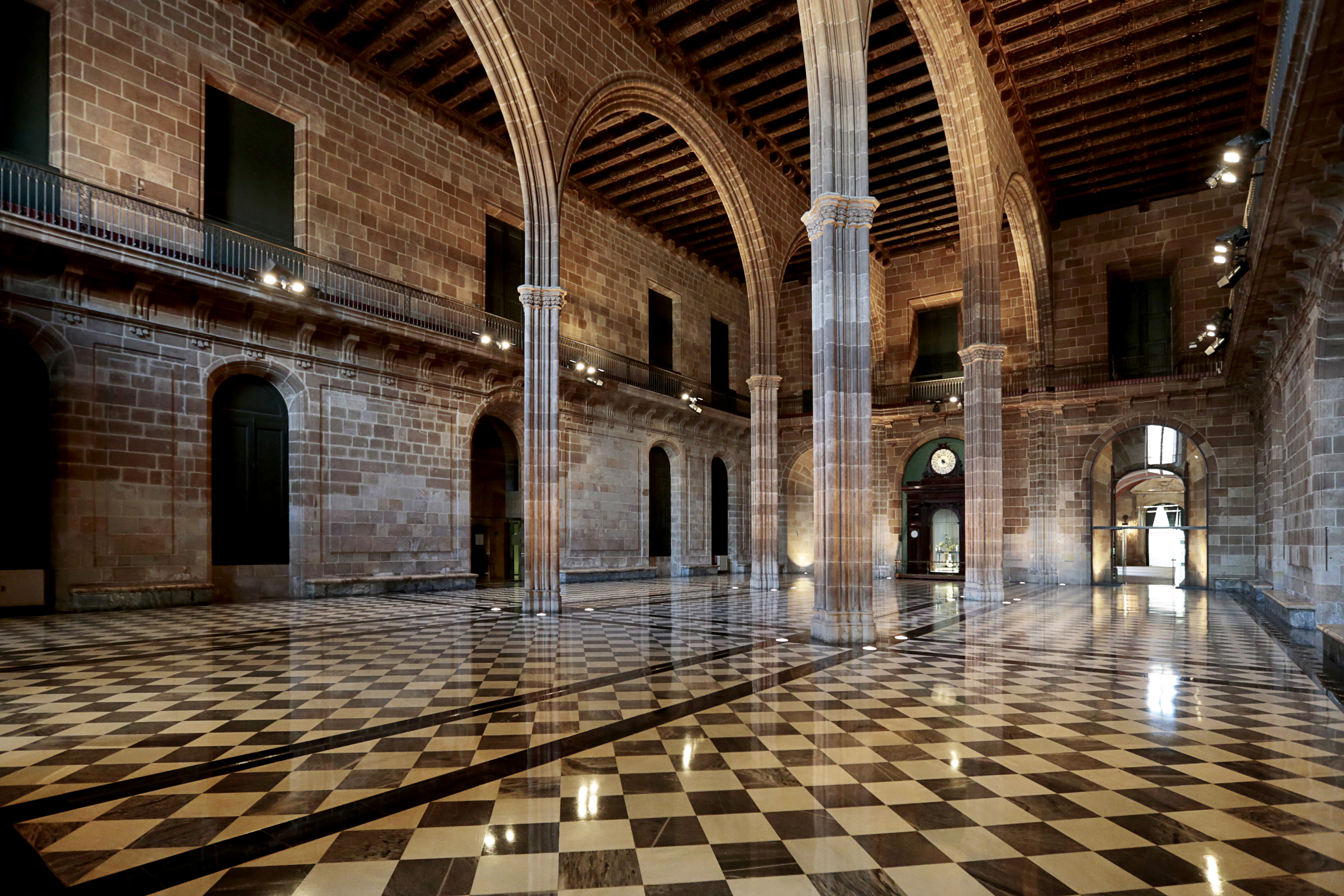
Interior of the Llotja de Barcelona where the city's Taula de canvi was operated

The Taula de canvi de Barcelona, established in 1401, is the first example of municipal, mostly public banks which pioneered central banking on a limited scale. It was soon emulated by the Bank of Saint George in the Republic of Genoa, first established in 1407, and significantly later by the Banco del Giro in the Republic of Venice and by a network of institutions in Naples that later consolidated into Banco di Napoli. Notable municipal central banks were established in the early 17th century in leading northwestern European commercial centers, namely the Bank of Amsterdam in 1609 and the Hamburger Bank in 1619. These institutions offered a public infrastructure for cashless international payments. They aimed to increase the efficiency of international trade and to safeguard monetary stability. These municipal public banks thus fulfilled comparable functions to modern central banks.

=== Early national central banks ===
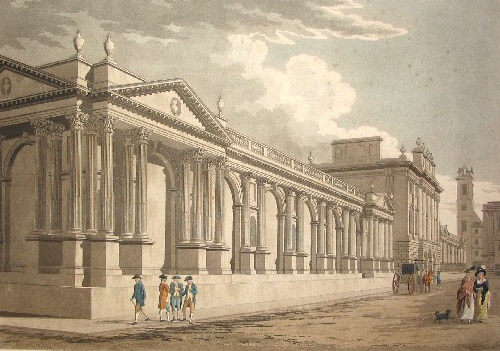
The Bank of England in 1791

The Swedish central bank, known since 1866 as Sveriges Riksbank, was founded in Stockholm in 1664 from the remains of the failed Stockholms Banco and answered to the Riksdag of the Estates, Sweden's early modern parliament. One role of the Swedish central bank was lending money to the government.

The establishment of the Bank of England was devised by Charles Montagu, 1st Earl of Halifax, following a 1691 proposal by William Paterson. A royal charter was granted on 27 July 1694 through the passage of the Tonnage Act. The bank was given exclusive possession of the government's balances, and was the only limited-liability corporation allowed to issue banknotes. The early modern Bank of England, however, did not have all the functions of a today's central banks, e.g. to regulate the value of the national currency, to finance the government, to be the sole authorized distributor of banknotes, or to function as a lender of last resort to banks suffering a liquidity crisis.

In the early 18th century, a major experiment in national central banking failed in France with John Law's Banque Royale in 1720–1721. Later in the century, France had other attempts with the Caisse d'Escompte first created in 1767, and King Charles III established the Bank of Spain in 1782. The Russian Assignation Bank, established in 1769 by Catherine the Great, was an outlier from the general pattern of early national central banks in that it was directly owned by the Imperial Russian government, rather than private individual shareholders. In the nascent United States, Alexander Hamilton, as Secretary of the Treasury in the 1790s, set up the First Bank of the United States despite heavy opposition from Jeffersonian Republicans.

=== National central banks since 1800 ===
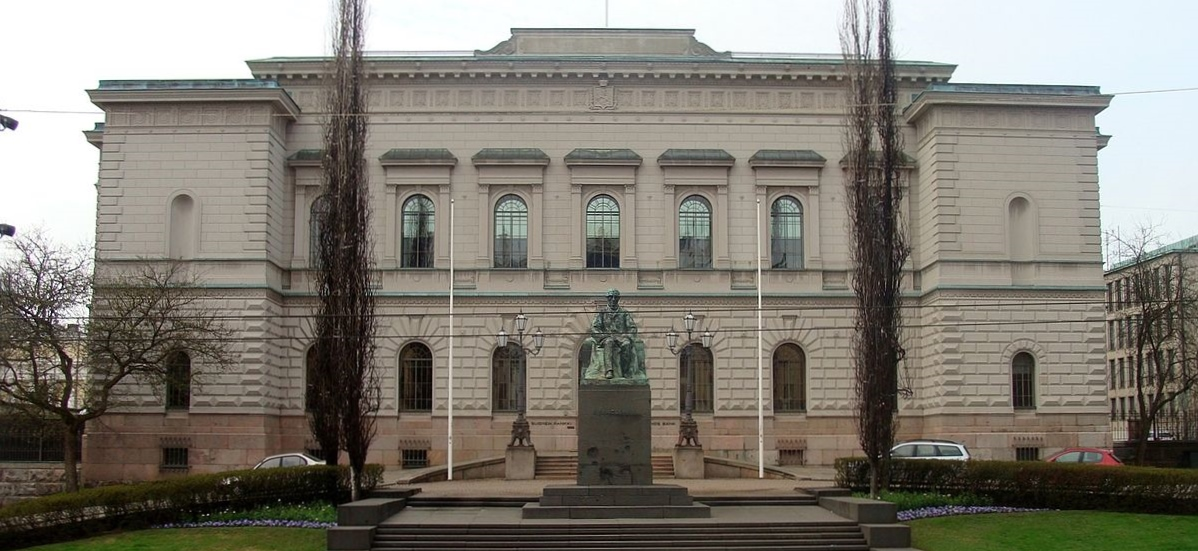
The Bank of Finland in Helsinki

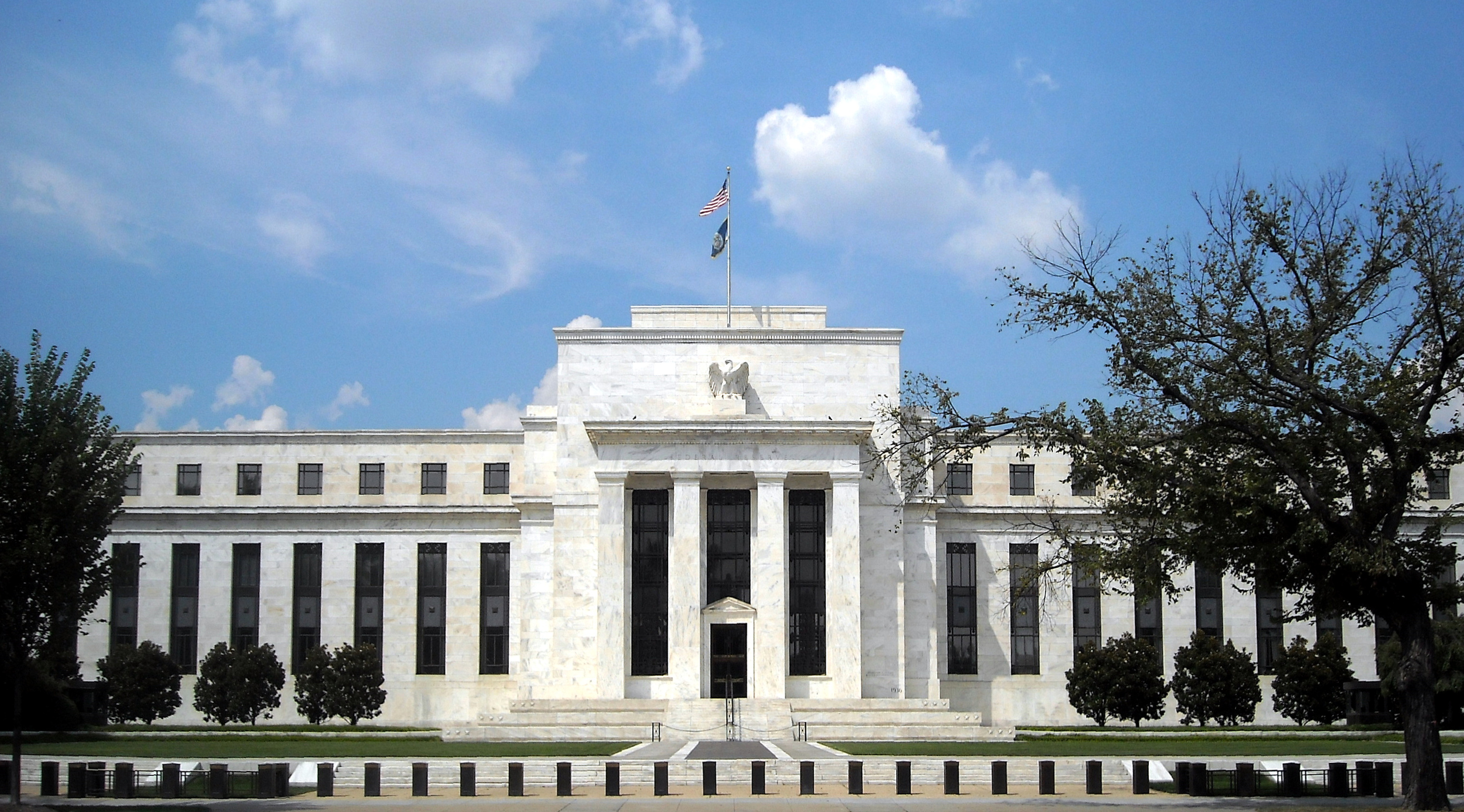
The Eccles Building in Washington, D.C. houses the main offices of the Board of Governors of the Federal Reserve.

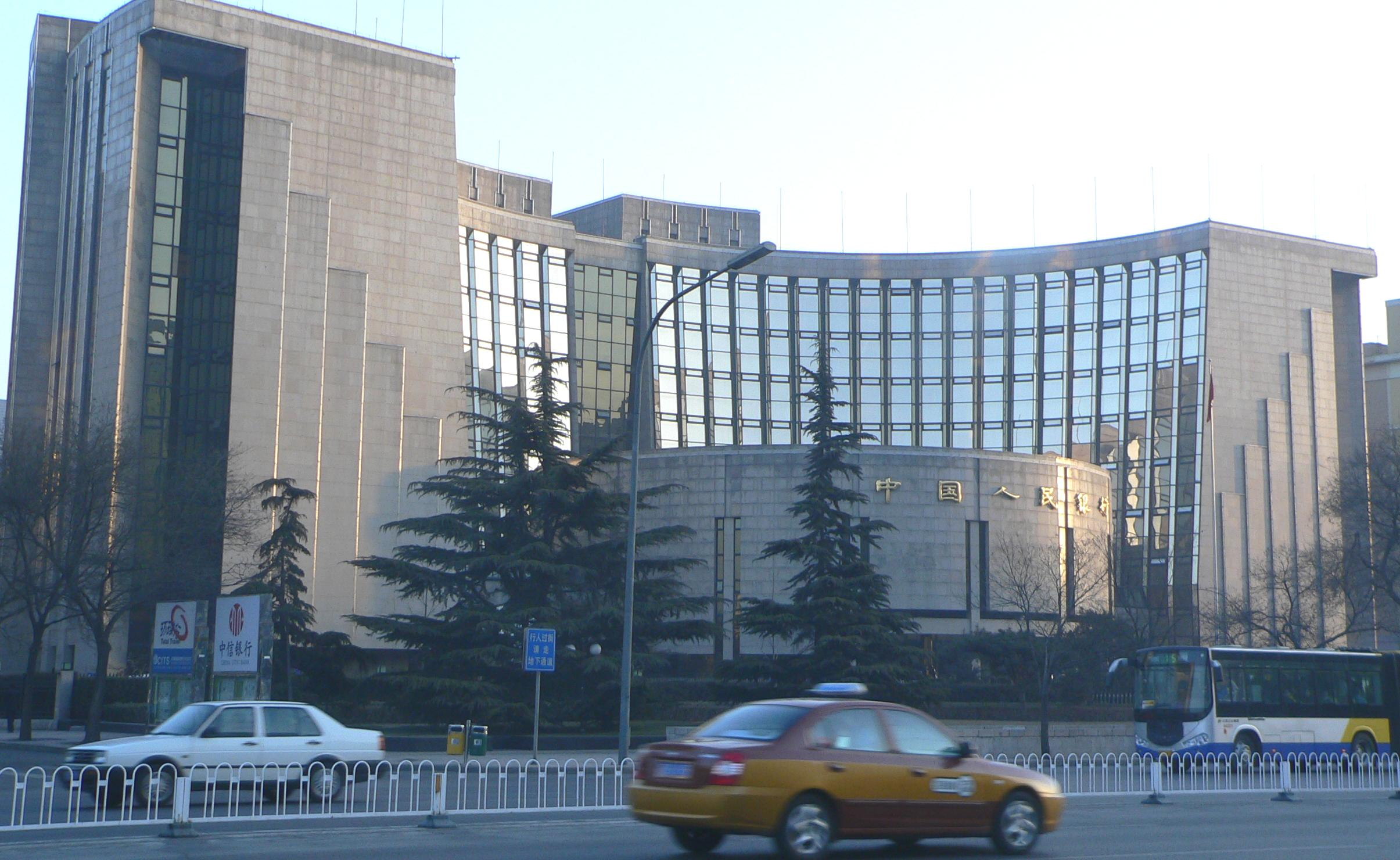
Head office of the People's Bank of China in Beijing

The RBI Central Office Building, also popularly known as the COB Tower in Mumbai, serves as the Reserve Bank of India's headquarters.

Central banks were established in many European countries during the 19th century. Napoleon created the Banque de France in 1800, in order to stabilize and develop the French economy and to improve the financing of his wars. The Bank of France remained the most important Continental European central bank throughout the 19th century. The Bank of Finland was founded in 1812, soon after Finland had been taken over from Sweden by Russia to become a grand duchy. Simultaneously, a quasi-central banking role was played by a small group of powerful family-run banking networks, typified by the House of Rothschild, with branches in major cities across Europe, as well as Hottinguer in Switzerland and Oppenheim in Germany.

The theory of central banking, even though the name was not yet widely used, evolved in the 19th century. Henry Thornton, an opponent of the real bills doctrine, was a defender of the bullionist position and a significant figure in monetary theory. Thornton's process of monetary expansion anticipated the theories of Knut Wicksell regarding the "cumulative process which restates the Quantity Theory in a theoretically coherent form". As a response to a currency crisis in 1797, Thornton wrote in 1802 An Enquiry into the Nature and Effects of the Paper Credit of Great Britain, in which he argued that the increase in paper credit did not cause the crisis. The book also gives a detailed account of the British monetary system as well as a detailed examination of the ways in which the Bank of England should act to counteract fluctuations in the value of the pound.

In the United Kingdom until the mid-nineteenth century, commercial banks were able to issue their own banknotes, and notes issued by provincial banking companies were commonly in circulation. Many consider the origins of the central bank to lie with the passage of the Bank Charter Act 1844. Under the 1844 Act, bullionism was institutionalized in Britain, creating a ratio between the gold reserves held by the Bank of England and the notes that the bank could issue. The Act also placed strict curbs on the issuance of notes by the country banks. The Bank of England took over a role of lender of last resort in the 1870s after criticism of its lacklustre response to the failure of Overend, Gurney and Company. The journalist Walter Bagehot wrote on the subject in Lombard Street: A Description of the Money Market, in which he advocated for the bank to officially become a lender of last resort during a credit crunch, sometimes referred to as "Bagehot's dictum".

The 19th and early 20th centuries central banks in most of Europe and Japan developed under the international gold standard. Free banking or currency boards were common at the time. Problems with collapses of banks during downturns, however, led to wider support for central banks in those nations which did not as yet possess them, for example in Australia. In the United States, the role of a central bank had been ended in the so-called Bank War of the 1830s by President Andrew Jackson. In 1913, the U.S. created the Federal Reserve System through the passing of The Federal Reserve Act.

Following World War I, the Economic and Financial Organization (EFO) of the League of Nations, influenced by the ideas of Montagu Norman and other leading policymakers and economists of the time, took an active role to promote the independence of central banks, a key component of the economic orthodoxy the EFO fostered at the Brussels Conference (1920). The EFO thus directed the creation of the Oesterreichische Nationalbank in Austria, Hungarian National Bank, Bank of Danzig, and Bank of Greece, as well as comprehensive reforms of the Bulgarian National Bank and Bank of Estonia. Similar ideas were emulated in other newly independent European countries, e.g. for the National Bank of Czechoslovakia.

Brazil established a central bank in 1945, which was a precursor to the Central Bank of Brazil created twenty years later. After gaining independence, numerous African and Asian countries also established central banks or monetary unions. The Reserve Bank of India, which had been established during British colonial rule as a private company, was nationalized in 1949 following India's independence. By the early 21st century, most of the world's countries had a national central bank set up as a public sector institution, albeit with widely varying degrees of independence.

=== Colonial, extraterritorial and federal central banks ===
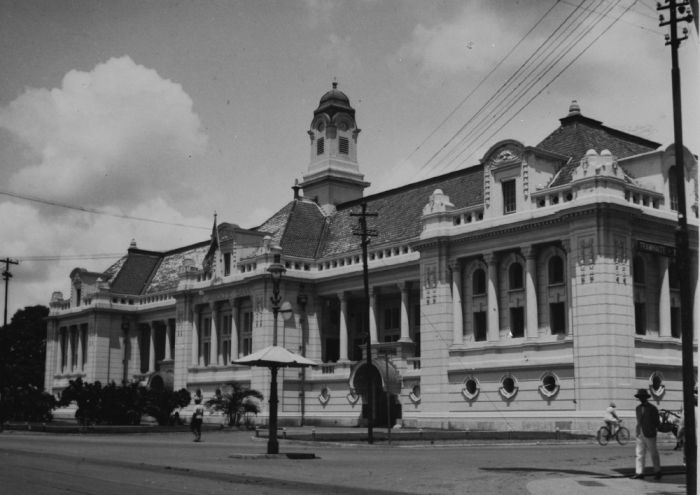
Head office of the Bank of Java in Batavia, early 20th century

Before the near-generalized adoption of the model of national public-sector central banks, a number of economies relied on a central bank that was effectively or legally run from outside their territory. The first colonial central banks, such as the Bank of Java (est. 1828 in Batavia), Banque de l'Algérie (est. 1851 in Algiers), or Hongkong and Shanghai Banking Corporation (est. 1865 in Hong Kong), operated from the colony itself. Following the generalization of the transcontinental use of the electrical telegraph using submarine communications cable, however, new colonial banks were typically headquartered in the colonial metropolis; prominent examples included the Paris-based Banque de l'Indochine (est. 1875), Banque de l'Afrique Occidentale (est. 1901), and Banque de Madagascar (est. 1925). The Banque de l'Algérie's head office was relocated from Algiers to Paris in 1900.

In some cases, independent countries which did not have a strong domestic base of capital accumulation and were critically reliant on foreign funding found advantage in granting a central banking role to banks that were effectively or even legally foreign. A seminal case was the Imperial Ottoman Bank established in 1863 as a French-British joint venture, and a particularly egregious one was the Paris-based National Bank of Haiti (est. 1881) which captured significant financial resources from the economically struggling albeit independent nation of Haiti. Other cases include the London-based Imperial Bank of Persia, established in 1885, and the Rome-based National Bank of Albania, established in 1925. The State Bank of Morocco was established in 1907 with international shareholding and headquarters functions distributed between Paris and Tangier, a half-decade before the country lost its independence. In other cases, there have been organized currency unions such as the Belgium–Luxembourg Economic Union established in 1921, under which Luxembourg had no central bank, but that was managed by a national central bank (in that case the National Bank of Belgium) rather than a supranational one. The present-day Common Monetary Area of Southern Africa has comparable features.

Yet another pattern was set in countries where federated or otherwise sub-sovereign entities had wide policy autonomy that was echoed to varying degrees in the organization of the central bank itself. These included, for example, the Austro-Hungarian Bank from 1878 to 1918, the U.S. Federal Reserve in its first two decades, the Bank deutscher Länder between 1948 and 1957, or the National Bank of Yugoslavia between 1972 and 1993. Conversely, some countries that are politically organized as federations, such as today's Canada, Mexico, or Switzerland, rely on a unitary central bank.

=== Supranational central banks ===
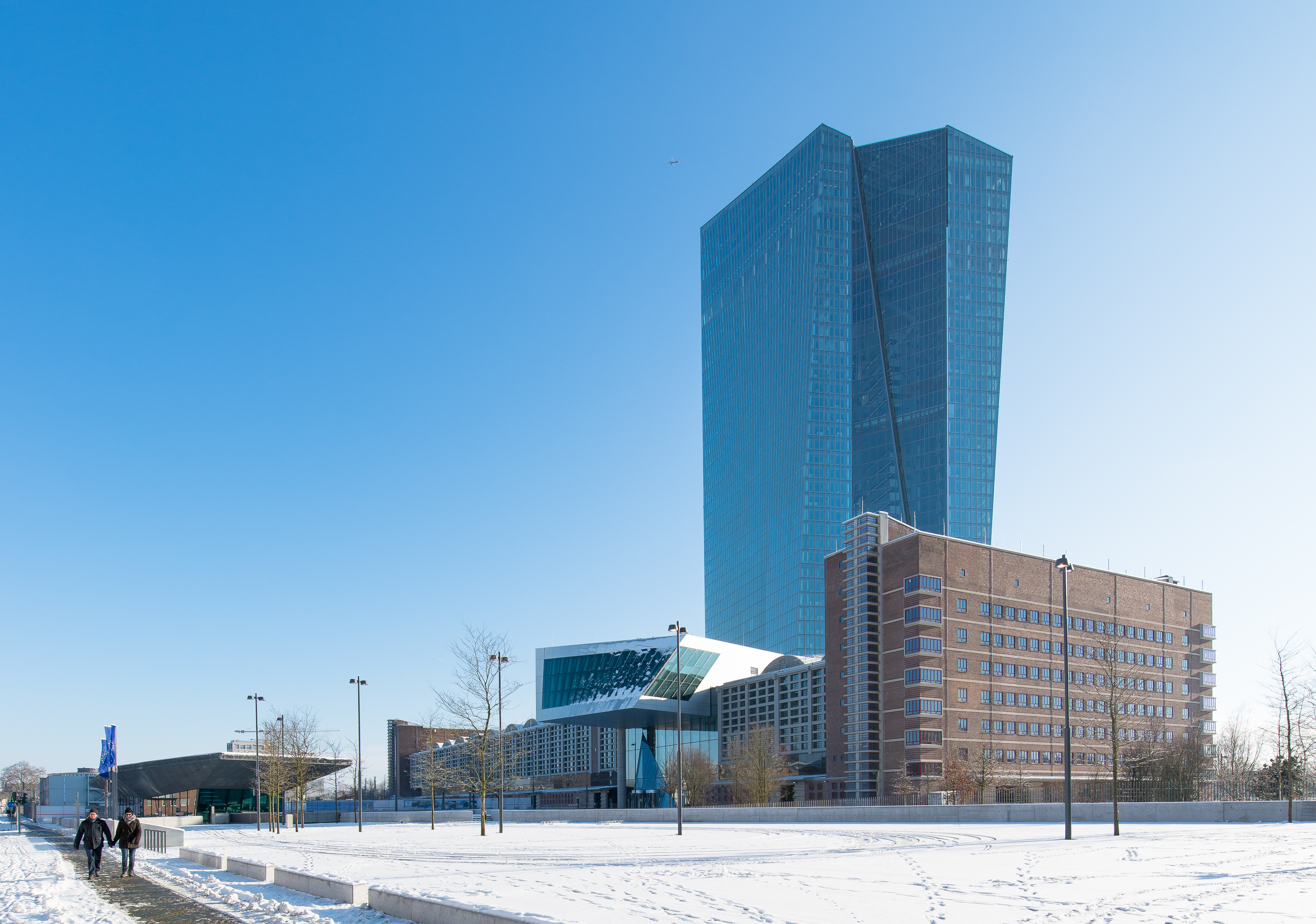
The European Central Bank's main building in Frankfurt

In the second half of the 20th century, the dismantling of colonial systems left some groups of countries using the same currency even though they had achieved national independence. In contrast to the unraveling of Austria-Hungary and the Ottoman Empire after World War I, some of these countries decided to keep using a common currency, thus forming a monetary union, and to entrust its management to a common central bank. Examples include the Eastern Caribbean Currency Authority, the Central Bank of West African States, and the Bank of Central African States.

The concept of supranational central banking took a globally significant dimension with the Economic and Monetary Union of the European Union and the establishment of the European Central Bank (ECB) in 1998. In 2014, the ECB took an additional role of banking supervision as part of the newly established policy of European banking union. Although the US Federal Reserve is not a supranational bank, the prominence of the US dollar gives the institution an outsized role in the international monetary market.

== Central bank mandates ==
Central bank mandates and goals can be set by law, executive, or is up to the discretion of the central bank depending on the country.

=== Price stability ===
The primary role of central banks is usually to maintain price stability, which can be defined as a specific level of inflation. Inflation is defined either as the devaluation of a currency or equivalently the rise of prices relative to a currency. Many central banks currently have an inflation target close to 2%. Alternative approaches to price stability include stability of price indices over longer time periods.

Since inflation lowers real wages, Keynesian economists view inflation as the solution to involuntary unemployment. However, "unanticipated" inflation leads to lender losses as the real interest rate will be lower than expected. Thus, Keynesian monetary policy aims for a steady rate of inflation.

=== High employment ===
Frictional unemployment is the time period between jobs when a worker is searching for, or transitioning from one job to another. Unemployment beyond frictional unemployment is classified as unintended unemployment. For example, structural unemployment is a form of unintended unemployment resulting from a mismatch between demand in the labour market and the skills and locations of the workers seeking employment. Macroeconomic policy generally aims to reduce unintended unemployment.

Keynes labeled any jobs that would be created by a rise in wage-goods (i.e., a decrease in real-wages) as involuntary unemployment:

Men are involuntarily unemployed if, in the event of a small rise in the price of wage-goods relatively to the money-wage, both the aggregate supply of labour willing to work for the current money-wage and the aggregate demand for it at that wage would be greater than the existing volume of employment.— John Maynard Keynes, The General Theory of Employment, Interest and Money p1

=== Economic growth ===
Economic growth can be enhanced by investment in capital, such as more or better machinery. A low interest rate implies that firms can borrow money to invest in their capital stock and pay less interest for it. Lowering the interest is therefore considered to encourage economic growth and is often used to alleviate times of low economic growth. On the other hand, raising the interest rate is often used in times of high economic growth as a contra-cyclical device to keep the economy from overheating and avoid market bubbles.

Further goals of monetary policy are stability of interest rates, of the financial market, and of the foreign exchange market. Goals frequently cannot be separated from each other and often conflict. For example, deficit spending tends to increase inflation. Goals must therefore be carefully weighed before policy implementation.

=== Tragedy of the commons mitigation ===
Some believe central banks should mitigate the tragedy of the commons, for example as in climate change. In the aftermath of the Paris agreement on climate change, a debate is now underway on whether central banks should also pursue environmental goals as part of their activities. In 2017, eight central banks formed the Network for Greening the Financial System (NGFS) to evaluate the way in which central banks can use their regulatory and monetary policy tools to support climate change mitigation. Today more than 70 central banks are part of the NGFS.

In January 2020, the European Central Bank has announced it will consider climate considerations when reviewing its monetary policy framework.

Proponents of "green monetary policy" are proposing that central banks include climate-related criteria in their collateral eligibility frameworks, when conducting asset purchases and also in their refinancing operations. But critics such as Jens Weidmann are arguing it is not central banks' role to conduct climate policy. China is among the most advanced central banks when it comes to green monetary policy. It has given green bonds preferential status to lower their yield and uses window policy to direct green lending.

The implications of potential stranded assets in the economy highlights one example of the embedded transition risk to climate change with potential cascade effects throughout the financial system. In response, four broad types of interventions including methodology development, investor encouragement, financial regulation and policy toolkits have been adopted by or suggested for central banks.

Achieving the 2°C threshold revolve in part around the development of climate-aligned financial regulations. A significant challenge lies in the lack of awareness among corporations and investors, driven by poor information flow and insufficient disclosure. To address this issue, regulators and central banks are promoting transparency, integrated reporting, and exposure specifications, with the goal of promoting long-term, low-carbon emission goals, rather than short-term financial objectives. These regulations aim to assess risk comprehensively, identifying carbon-intensive assets and increasing their capital requirements. This should result in high-carbon assets becoming less attractive while favoring low-carbon assets, which have historically been perceived as high-risk, and low volatility investment vehicles.

Quantitative easing is a potential measure that could be applied by Central banks to achieve a low-carbon transition. Although there is a historical bias toward high-carbon companies, included in Central banks portfolios due to their high credit ratings, innovative approaches to quantitative easing could invert this trend to favor low-carbon assets.

Considering the potential impact of central banks on climate change, it is important to consider the mandates of central banks. The mandate of a central bank can be narrow, meaning only a few objectives are given, limiting the ability of a central bank to include climate change in its policies. However, central bank mandates may not necessarily have to be modified to accommodate climate change-related activities. For example, the European Central Bank has incorporated carbon-emissions into its asset purchase criteria, despite its relatively narrow mandate that focuses on price stability.

== Central bank operations ==
The functions of a central bank may include:

- Monetary policy: by setting the official interest rate and controlling the money supply;
- Financial stability: acting as a government's banker and as the bankers' bank ("lender of last resort");
- Reserve management: managing a country's foreign-exchange and gold reserves and government bonds;
- Banking supervision: regulating and supervising the banking industry, and currency exchange;
- Payments system: managing or supervising means of payments and inter-banking clearing systems;
- Coins and notes issuance;
- Other functions of central banks may include economic research, statistical collection, supervision of deposit guarantee schemes, advice to government in financial policy.

=== Monetary policy ===
Central banks implement a country's chosen monetary policy.

==== Currency issuance ====
At the most basic level, monetary policy involves establishing what form of currency the country may have, whether a fiat currency, gold-backed currency (disallowed for countries in the International Monetary Fund), currency board or a currency union. When a country has its own national currency, this involves the issue of some form of standardized currency, which is essentially a form of promissory note: "money" under certain circumstances. Historically, this was often a promise to exchange the money for precious metals in some fixed amount. Now, when many currencies are fiat money, the "promise to pay" consists of the promise to accept that currency to pay for taxes. A central bank in a fiat money system with monetary sovereignty cannot become insolvent due to seigniorage.

A central bank may use another country's currency either directly in a currency union, or indirectly on a currency board. In the latter case, exemplified by the Bulgarian National Bank, Hong Kong and Latvia (until 2014), the local currency is backed at a fixed rate by the central bank's holdings of a foreign currency. Similar to commercial banks, central banks hold assets (government bonds, foreign exchange, gold, and other financial assets) and incur liabilities (currency outstanding). Central banks create money by issuing banknotes and loaning them to the government in exchange for interest-bearing assets such as government bonds. When central banks decide to increase the money supply by an amount which is greater than the amount their national governments decide to borrow, the central banks may purchase private bonds or assets denominated in foreign currencies.

The European Central Bank remits its interest income to the central banks of the member countries of the European Union. The US Federal Reserve remits most of its profits to the U.S. Treasury. This income, derived from the power to issue currency, is referred to as seigniorage, and usually belongs to the national government. The state-sanctioned power to create currency is called the Right of Issuance. Throughout history, there have been disagreements over this power, since whoever controls the creation of currency controls the seigniorage income. The expression "monetary policy" may also refer more narrowly to the interest-rate targets and other active measures undertaken by the monetary authority.

==== Monetary policy instruments ====
The primary monetary policy tool available to central banks is the administered interest rate paid on qualifying deposits held with them. Adjusting this rate up or down influences the rate commercial banks pay on their own customer deposits, which in turn influences the rate that commercial banks charge customers for loans.

A central bank affects the monetary base through open market operations, if its country has a well developed market for its government bonds. This entails managing the quantity of money in circulation through the buying and selling of various financial instruments, such as treasury bills, repurchase agreements or "repos", company bonds, or foreign currencies, in exchange for money on deposit at the central bank. Those deposits are convertible to currency, so all of these purchases or sales result in more or less base currency entering or leaving market circulation.

If the central bank wishes to decrease interest rates, it reduces its administered rates (Bank Rate, the reverse repurchase agreement rate and the discount rate). This results in commercial banks bidding down the rate they pay customers on their deposits and, subsequently, loan rates are reduced commensurately. Cheaper credit can increase consumer spending or business investment, stimulating output growth. On the other hand, cheaper interest income can reduce spending, suppressing output. Additionally, when business loans are more affordable, companies can expand to keep up with consumer demand. They ultimately hire more workers, whose incomes increase, which in its turn also increases the demand. This method is usually enough to stimulate demand and drive economic growth to a higher rate. In other instances, monetary policy might instead entail the targeting of a specific exchange rate relative to some foreign currency or else relative to gold. For example, in the case of the United States, the Federal Reserve targets the federal funds rate, the rate at which member banks lend to one another overnight; however, the monetary policy of China (since 2014) is to target the exchange rate between the Chinese renminbi and a basket of foreign currencies.

A third alternative is to change reserve requirements. The reserve requirement refers to the proportion of total liabilities that banks must keep on hand overnight, either in its vaults or at the central bank. Banks only maintain a small portion of their assets as cash available for immediate withdrawal; the rest is invested in illiquid assets like mortgages and loans. Lowering the reserve requirement frees up funds for banks to buy other profitable assets. However, even though this tool immediately increases liquidity, central banks rarely change the reserve requirement because doing so frequently adds uncertainty to banks' planning. Most modern central banks now have zero formal reserve requirement.

==== Unconventional monetary policy ====
Other forms of monetary policy, particularly used when interest rates are at or near 0% and there are concerns about deflation or deflation is occurring, are referred to as unconventional monetary policy. These include credit easing, quantitative easing, forward guidance, and signalling. In credit easing, a central bank purchases private sector assets to improve liquidity and improve access to credit. Signaling can be used to lower market expectations for lower interest rates in the future. For example, during the credit crisis of 2008, the US Federal Reserve indicated rates would be low for an "extended period", and the Bank of Canada made a "conditional commitment" to keep rates at the lower bound of 25 basis points (0.25%) until the end of the second quarter of 2010.

Some have envisaged the use of what Milton Friedman once called "helicopter money" whereby the central bank would make direct transfers to citizens in order to lift inflation up to the central bank's intended target. Such policy option could be particularly effective at the zero lower bound.

==== Central Bank Digital Currencies ====
Since 2017, prospect of implementing Central Bank Digital Currency (CBDC) has been in discussion. As of the end of 2018, at least 15 central banks were considering to implementing CBDC. Since 2014, the People's Bank of China has been working on a project for digital currency to make its own digital currency and electronic payment systems.

=== Banking supervision and other activities ===
In some countries a central bank, through its subsidiaries, controls and monitors the banking sector. In other countries banking supervision is carried out by a government department such as the UK Treasury, or by an independent government agency, for example, UK's Financial Conduct Authority. It examines the banks' balance sheets and behaviour and policies toward consumers. Apart from refinancing, it also provides banks with services such as transfer of funds, bank notes and coins or foreign currency. Thus it is often described as the "bank of banks".

Many countries will monitor and control the banking sector through several different agencies and for different purposes. The Bank regulation in the United States for example is highly fragmented with 3 federal agencies, the Federal Deposit Insurance Corporation, the Federal Reserve Board, or Office of the Comptroller of the Currency and numerous others on the state and the private level. There is usually significant cooperation between the agencies. For example, money center banks, deposit-taking institutions, and other types of financial institutions may be subject to different (and occasionally overlapping) regulation. Some types of banking regulation may be delegated to other levels of government, such as state or provincial governments.

Any cartel of banks is particularly closely watched and controlled. Most countries control bank mergers and are wary of concentration in this industry due to the danger of groupthink and runaway lending bubbles based on a single point of failure, the credit culture of the few large banks.

=== Public communication ===
Central banks have increasingly engaged in public communication to ensure accountability, build trust, and manage inflation expectations. Various aspects of central bank communication are also analyzed, including textual content through text mining techniques, facial expressions during press conferences, vocal characteristics, and the clarity and readability of monetary policy announcements.

=== Central bank governance and independence ===
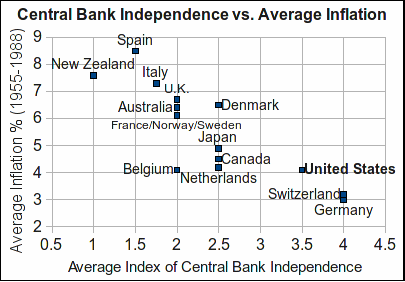
Central bank independence versus inflation. This often cited research published by Alesina and Summers (1993) is used to show why it is important for a nation's central bank (i.e.-monetary authority) to have a high level of independence. This chart shows a clear trend towards a lower inflation rate as the independence of the central bank increases. The generally agreed upon reason independence leads to lower inflation is that politicians have a tendency to create too much money if given the opportunity to do it. The Federal Reserve System in the United States is generally regarded as one of the more independent central banks.

Numerous governments have opted to make central banks independent. The economic logic behind central bank independence is that when governments delegate monetary policy to an independent central bank (with an anti-inflationary purpose) and away from elected politicians, monetary policy will not reflect the interests of the politicians. When governments control monetary policy, politicians may be tempted to boost economic activity in advance of an election to the detriment of the long-term health of the economy and the country. As a consequence, financial markets may not consider future commitments to low inflation to be credible when monetary policy is in the hands of elected officials, which increases the risk of capital flight. An alternative to central bank independence is to have fixed exchange rate regimes.

Governments generally have some degree of influence over even "independent" central banks; the aim of independence is primarily to prevent short-term interference. In 1951, the Deutsche Bundesbank became the first central bank to be given full independence, leading this form of central bank to be referred to as the "Bundesbank model", as opposed, for instance, to the New Zealand model, which has a goal (i.e. inflation target) set by the government.

Central bank independence is usually guaranteed by legislation and the institutional framework governing the bank's relationship with elected officials, particularly the minister of finance. Central bank legislation will enshrine specific procedures for selecting and appointing the head of the central bank. Often the minister of finance will appoint the governor in consultation with the central bank's board and its incumbent governor. In addition, the legislation will specify banks governor's term of appointment. The most independent central banks enjoy a fixed non-renewable term for the governor in order to eliminate pressure on the governor to please the government in the hope of being re-appointed for a second term. Generally, independent central banks enjoy both goal and instrument independence.

Despite their independence, central banks are usually accountable at some level to government officials, either to the finance ministry or to parliament. For example, the Board of Governors of the U.S. Federal Reserve are nominated by the U.S. president and confirmed by the Senate, publishes verbatim transcripts, and balance sheets are audited by the Government Accountability Office. Central banks can be accountable and legitimized through laws.

In the 1990s there was a trend towards increasing the independence of central banks as a way of improving long-term economic performance. While a large volume of economic research has been done to define the relationship between central bank independence and economic performance, the results are ambiguous.

The literature on central bank independence has defined a cumulative and complementary number of aspects:

- Institutional independence: The independence of the central bank is enshrined in law and shields central banks from political interference. In general terms, institutional independence means that politicians should refrain from seeking to influence monetary policy decisions, while symmetrically central banks should also avoid influencing government politics.
- Goal independence: The central bank has the right to set its own policy goals, whether inflation targeting, control of the money supply, or maintaining a fixed exchange rate. While this type of independence is more common, many central banks prefer to announce their policy goals in partnership with the appropriate government departments. This increases the transparency of the policy-setting process and thereby increases the credibility of the goals chosen by providing assurance that they will not be changed without notice. In addition, the setting of common goals by the central bank and the government helps to avoid situations where monetary and fiscal policy are in conflict; a policy combination that is clearly sub-optimal.
- Functional & operational independence: The central bank has the independence to determine the best way of achieving its policy goals, including the types of instruments used and the timing of their use. To achieve its mandate, the central bank has the authority to run its own operations (appointing staff, setting budgets, and so on.) and to organize its internal structures without excessive involvement of the government. This is the most common form of central bank independence. The granting of independence to the Bank of England in 1997 was, in fact, the granting of operational independence; the inflation target continued to be announced in the Chancellor's annual budget speech to Parliament.
- Personal independence: The other forms of independence are not possible unless central bank heads have a high security of tenure. In practice, this means that governors should hold long mandates (at least longer than the electoral cycle) and a certain degree of legal immunity. The turnover rate of central bank governors has been used as a proxy for de facto central bank independence. If a government is in the habit of appointing and replacing the governor frequently, it clearly has the capacity to micro-manage the central bank through its choice of governors.
- Financial independence: central banks have full autonomy on their budget, and some are even prohibited from financing governments. This is meant to remove incentives from politicians to influence central banks.
- Legal independence : some central banks have their own legal personality, which allows them to ratify international agreements without the government's approval (like the ECB), and to go to court.

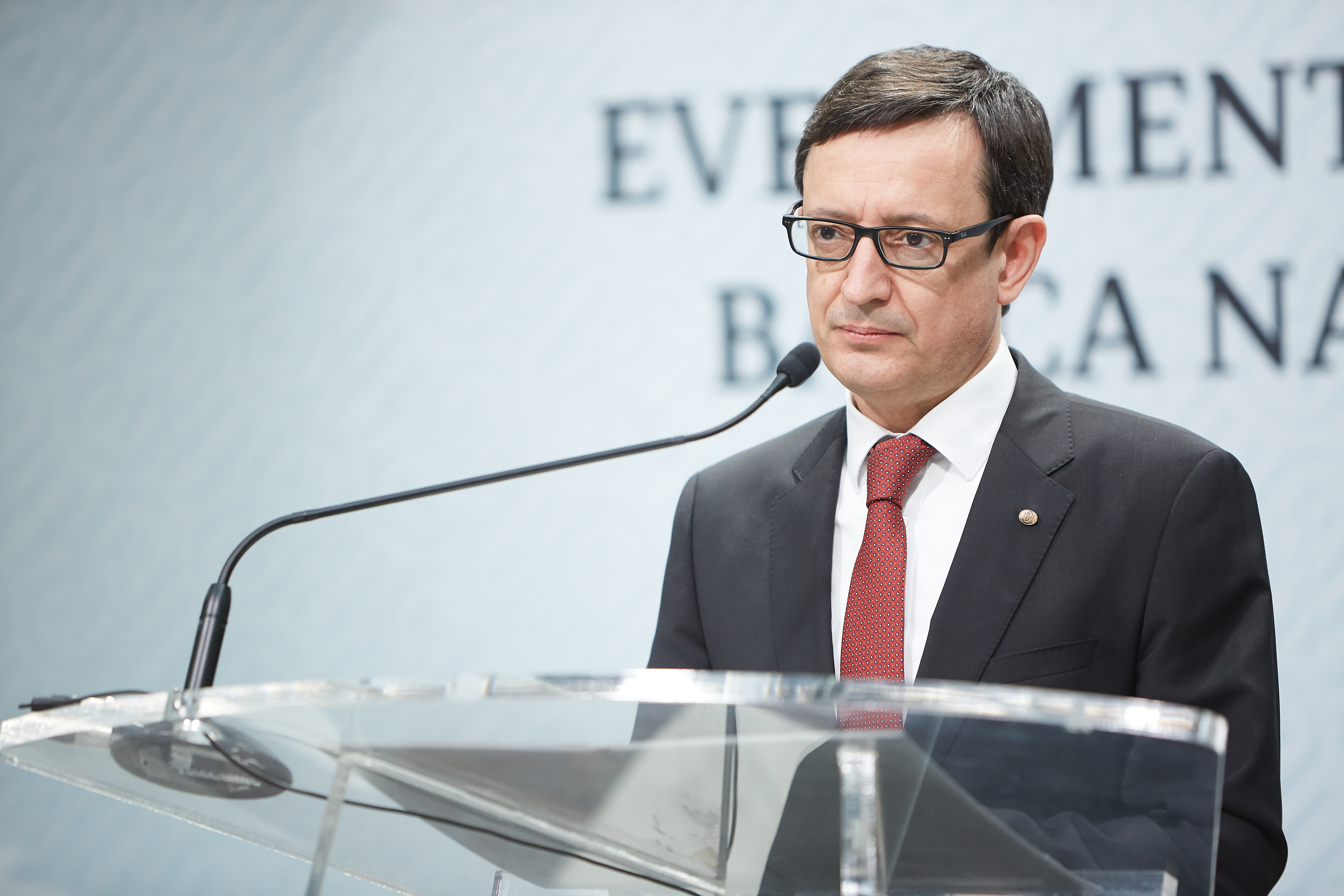
Octavian Armașu, NBM governor, whose dismissal in 2023 raised concerns about central bank independence in Moldova

There is very strong consensus among economists that an independent central bank can run a more credible monetary policy, making market expectations more responsive to signals from the central bank. Both the Bank of England (1997) and the European Central Bank have been made independent and follow a set of published inflation targets so that markets know what to expect. Populism can reduce de facto central bank independence. International organizations such as the World Bank, the Bank for International Settlements (BIS) and the International Monetary Fund (IMF) strongly support central bank independence. This results, in part, from a belief in the intrinsic merits of increased independence. The support for independence from the international organizations also derives partly from the connection between increased independence for the central bank and increased transparency in the policy-making process. The IMF's Financial Services Action Plan (FSAP) review self-assessment, for example, includes a number of questions about central bank independence in the transparency section. An independent central bank will score higher in the review than one that is not independent.

Central bank independence indices allow a quantitative analysis of central bank independence for individual countries over time. One central bank independence index is the Garriga CBI.

== Statistics ==
Collectively, central banks purchase less than 500 tonnes of gold each year, on average (out of an annual global production of 2,500–3,000 tonnes). In 2018, central banks collectively hold over 33,000 metric tons of the gold, about a fifth of all the gold ever mined, according to Bloomberg News.

In 2016, 75% of the world's central-bank assets were controlled by four centers in China, the United States, Japan and the eurozone. The central banks of Brazil, Switzerland, Saudi Arabia, the U.K., India and Russia, each account for an average of 2.5 percent. The remaining 107 central banks hold less than 13 percent. According to data compiled by Bloomberg News, the top 10 largest central banks owned $21.4 trillion in assets, a 10 percent increase from 2015. Following is a ranking of the 5 biggest:

Rank	Bank name	Headquarters	Total assets(US$ billion)
1	(United States) Federal Reserve System	Washington, D.C.	8,349.17
2	Bank of Japan	Tokyo	6,621.18
3	(European Union) European Central Bank	Frankfurt am Main	6,590.00
4	People's Bank of China	Beijing	3,450.00
5	(Germany) Deutsche Bundesbank	Frankfurt am Main	3,159.87

== Criticism ==
Central banks have faced staunch criticism and opposition throughout history. Thomas Jefferson distrusted central banks and opposed its purchasing of public debt, which he thought created long-term debt, bred monopolies, and invited dangerous speculation as opposed to productive labor.

In a letter to John Taylor, Jefferson wrote,

Banking establishments are more dangerous than standing armies; & that the principle of spending money to be paid by posterity, under the name of funding, is but swindling futurity on a large scale.

Andrew Jackson similarly opposed central banks, viewing them as a fourth branch of government run by an elite. He called them the "money power" that sought to control the labor and earnings of the "real people", who depend on their own efforts to succeed: the planters, farmers, mechanics, and laborers.

Some economists have also expressed opposition to the establishment of central banks. In Friedrich Hayek's book, Prices and Production (1931), he argued that the business cycle resulted from the central bank's inflationary credit expansion and its transmission over time, leading to a capital misallocation caused by the artificially low interest rates. Murray Rothbard called central banks the "engine of monetary inflation."

== See also ==
- Bank for International Settlements
- Foreign exchange reserves
- Fractional-reserve banking
- Free banking
- Full-reserve banking
- History of central banking in the United States
- List of central banks
- List of sovereign states by central bank interest rates
