= Ons Geld =

Dutch monetary reform foundation

- Formation: 2012
- Founder: Luuk de Waal Malefijit
- Purpose: Sovereign monetary reform
- Location: Netherlands
- Website: onsgeld.nu

Ons Geld (Dutch for "Our Money") is a foundation that promotes sovereign monetary reform in the Netherlands. The 2015 citizens initiative gathered over 100,000 signatures, leading to a parliamentary debate and comprehensive study of the monetary system.

== History ==
Ons Geld emerged during concern about the monetary system in the Netherlands. After the 2008 financial crisis, the 2012 Liikanen report and 2013 Wijffels Commission recommended structural reform the EU banking sector.

The Ons Geld foundation was set up in 2012 by Luuk de Waal Malefijit, inspired by Positive Money. Activist theatre group The Persuaders (De verleiders) produced a play on the production of money in 2014 inspired by Ons Geld.

== Citizens' initiative campaign ==
In 2015, Ons Geld and The Persuaders launched a citizen initiative and gathered 113,878 signatures supporting their monetary proposal, far exceeding the required 40,000. In April 2015, the initiative was submitted to the Dutch House of Representatives, calling for money creation to be taken away from commercial banks and for money to serve the public interest.

== Parliamentary impact ==
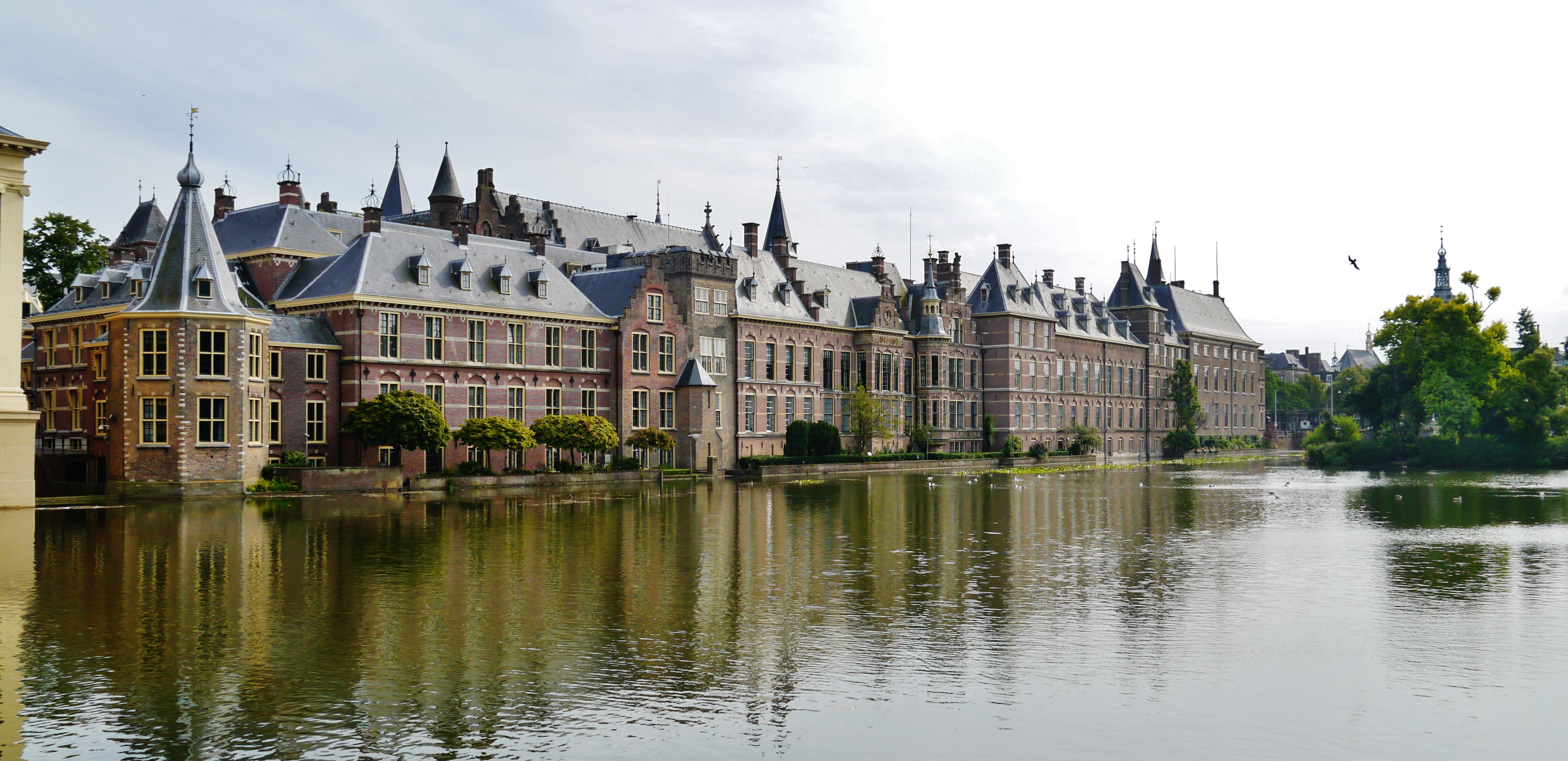
The Binnenhof complex holds the parliament building in the Netherlands

The initiative's success led to a hearing, followed by a March 2016 debate. The Dutch Parliament adopted a motion for that the government commission a comprehensive study of the monetary system.

== WRR report commission ==
The Ons Geld initiative and parliamentary debate led the Dutch Minister of Finance to formally request the Scientific Council for Government Policy (WRR) to conduct a detailed analysis of the current monetary system and possible alternatives. This resulted in the report "Money and Debt: The Public Role of Banks" presented to the Dutch government in January 2019.

== Waterworks of money ==
Martijn Jeroen van der Linden from Ons Geld collaborated with Carlijn Kingma on the Waterworks of Money, an animated hydraulic metaphor for finance.
