= Helicopter money =

Policy proposal; central banks making direct money transfers to the public

Helicopter money is a proposed monetary policy for inflation targeting, sometimes suggested as an alternative to quantitative easing (QE) when the economy is in a liquidity trap (when interest rates near zero and the economy remains in recession). Although the original idea of helicopter money describes central banks making payments directly to individuals, economists have used the term "helicopter money" to refer to a wide range of different policy ideas, including the "permanent" monetization of budget deficits – with the additional element of attempting to shock beliefs about future inflation or nominal GDP growth, in order to change expectations. A second set of policies, closer to the original description of helicopter money, and more innovative in the context of monetary history, involves the central bank making direct transfers to the private sector financed with base money, without the direct involvement of fiscal authorities. This has also been called a citizens' dividend or a distribution of future seigniorage.

The name "helicopter money" was first coined by Milton Friedman in 1969, when he wrote a parable about dropping money from a helicopter to illustrate the effects of monetary expansion. The concept was revived by economists as a monetary policy proposal in the early 2000s following Japan's Lost Decade. In November 2002, Ben Bernanke, then Federal Reserve Board governor, and later chairman suggested that helicopter money could always be used to prevent deflation.

A monetary policy that involves helicopter money requires that central banks operate with negative equity. This touches on an old question in economics on whether money should always be fully backed by segregated assets (gold, loans) or whether lower levels of asset backing are warranted to counter deflationary pressures. This question is again relevant due to the negative side effects of low interest rate policies as well as the development of central bank digital currency.

== Origins ==
Although very similar concepts have been previously defended by various people including Major Douglas and the Social Credit Movement, Nobel winning economist Milton Friedman is known to be the one who coined the term 'helicopter money' in the now famous paper "The Optimum Quantity of Money" (1969), where he included the following parable:

Let us suppose now that one day a helicopter flies over this community and drops an additional $1,000 in bills from the sky, which is, of course, hastily collected by members of the community. Let us suppose further that everyone is convinced that this is a unique event which will never be repeated.

Originally used by Friedman to illustrate the effects of monetary policy on inflation and the costs of holding money, rather than an actual policy proposal, the concept has since then been increasingly discussed by economists as a serious alternative to monetary policy instruments such as quantitative easing. According to its proponents, helicopter money would be a more efficient way to increase aggregate demand, especially in a situation of liquidity trap, when central banks have reached the so-called "zero lower bound".

Friedman himself refers to financing transfer payments with base money as evidence that monetary policy still has power when conventional policies have failed, in his discussion of the Pigou effect, in his 1968 AER Presidential address. Specifically, Friedman argues that "[the] revival of belief in the potency of monetary policy ... was strongly fostered among economists by the theoretical developments initiated by Haberler but named for Pigou that pointed out a channel – namely changes in wealth – whereby changes in the real quantity of money can affect aggregate demand even if they do not alter interest rates". Friedman is clear that money must be produced "in other ways" than open-market operations, which – like QE – involve "simply substituting money for other assets without changing total wealth". Friedman references a paper by Gottfried Haberler written in 1952, where Haberler says: "Suppose the quantity of money is increased by tax reductions or government transfer payments, and the resulting deficit is financed by borrowing from the central bank or simply printing money."

It is noteworthy in light of more recent debates over the separation between monetary and fiscal policy, that Friedman viewed these policies as evidence of the potency of monetary policy. In the same AER address, he is highly critical of the timeliness and efficacy of fiscal measures to stabilize demand.

=== Revival in the 2000s ===
The idea of helicopter drops was revived as a serious policy proposal in the early 2000s by economists considering the lessons from Japan. Ben Bernanke famously delivered a speech on preventing deflation in November 2002 as a Federal Reserve Board governor, where he said that Keynes "once semi-seriously proposed, as an anti-deflationary measure, that the government fill bottles with currency and bury them in mine shafts to be dug up by the public". In that speech, Bernanke himself says: "a money-financed tax cut is essentially equivalent to Milton Friedman's famous 'helicopter drop' of money". In a footnote to that speech, Bernanke also references an important paper by Gauti Eggertson which emphasizes the importance of a commitment from the central bank to keep the money supply at a higher level in the future.

The Irish economist, Eric Lonergan, also argued in 2002 in the Financial Times, that central banks consider cash transfers to households as an alternative to further reductions in interest rates, also on the grounds of financial stability. In 2003, Willem Buiter, then chief economist at the European Bank for Reconstruction and Development, revived the concept of helicopter money in a theoretical paper, arguing that base money is not a liability, which provides a more rigorous case for Friedman and Haberler's Pigouvian intuitions.

=== After the 2008 financial crisis ===
In December 2008, Eric Lonergan and Martin Wolf suggested in the Financial Times that central banks make cash transfers directly to households, financed with base money, to combat the threat of global deflation. From around 2012 onwards, some other economists began advocating variants of helicopter drops, including "QE for the people" and a "debt jubilee" financed with the monetary base. These proposals reflected a sense that conventional policies, including QE, were failing or having many adverse effects – on either financial stability or the distribution of wealth and income.

In 2013, the chairman of the UK's Financial Services Authority (FSA), Adair Turner, who had been considered a serious candidate to succeed Mervyn King as Governor of the Bank of England, argued that deficit monetization is the fastest way to recover from the 2008 financial crisis in a speech.

== Implementation ==
Under a strict definition, where helicopter drops are simply transfers from the central bank to the private sector financed with base money a number of economists have argued that they are already occurring. In 2016, the European Central Bank (ECB) launched a programme of targeted longer-term refinancing operations (TLTROs), lending money to banks at negative interest rates, which amounts to a transfer to banks. Also, the use of differential interest rates on tiered reserves to support commercial banks' profitability in the face of negative interest rates, opens up another source of helicopter drop – albeit intermediated by banks.

In the case of the Eurozone, the use of TLTROs is believed by some economists to provide a legal and administratively tractable means of introducing transfers to households. The economist, Eric Lonergan, argued in 2016 that legal helicopter drops in the Eurozone could be structured via zero coupon, perpetual loans, which all European adult citizens would be eligible to receive. The loans could be administered by eligible commercial banks, and under certain conditions the loans would be net interest income positive to the central bank. Other advocates such as think tank Positive Money or BlackRock's Stanley Fischer and Philipp Hildebrand propose to introduce helicopter money through soft forms of cooperation with fiscal authorities.

=== Differences from quantitative easing ===
Like all expansionary monetary policies in general, quantitative easing (QE) and helicopter money involves money creation by central banks to expand the money supply. However, the effect on the central bank's balance sheet of helicopter money is different than with QE. Under QE, central banks create reserves by purchasing bonds or other financial assets, conducting an "asset swap". The swap is reversible. By contrast, with helicopter money, central banks give away the money created, without increasing assets on their balance sheet.

Economists argue that the effect on expectations is different because helicopter money created would be perceived as "permanent" – that is, more irreversible than QE.

== Supporters ==
Former chairman of the Federal Reserve Ben Bernanke is known to be one of the proponents of helicopter money when he gave a speech in November 2002 arguing, in the case of Japan, that "a money-financed tax cut is essentially equivalent to Milton Friedman's famous 'helicopter drop' of money". In April 2016, Ben Bernanke wrote a blog post arguing that "such programs may be the best available alternative. It would be premature to rule them out". Fed chairwoman Janet Yellen also admitted that helicopter money could be an option in "extreme situations".

Citigroup Chief Economist Willem Buiter is also known to be a prominent advocate of the concept. Other proponents include Financial Times' Chief Commentator Martin Wolf, Oxford economists John Muellbauer, and Simon Wren-Lewis, Economist Steve Keen, the political economist Mark Blyth of Brown University, Berkeley economics professor and former Treasury advisor, Brad DeLong, UCLA economics professor, Roger Farmer, American macro hedge fund manager Ray Dalio, Irish economist and Fund manager Eric Lonergan, Anatole Kaletsky, Romain Baeriswyl, Martin Sandbu, and Jean Pisani-Ferry.

The idea also finds support among central bankers. For example, former governor of the Irish central bank Patrick Honohan said he believes the policy would work while the ECB's chief economist Peter Praet once said: "All central banks can do it." The Vice-Governor of the Czech Central Bank Mojmír Hampl published a paper in which he writes that "the idea offers many virtues and advantages compared to other forms of unconventional monetary policy, especially obliterating the need to rely on a complicated transmission mechanism, allowing much easier communication to the public, and boosting consumer confidence when most needed".

Bill Gross, Portfolio Manager of the Janus Global Unconstrained Bond Fund also argues for the implementation of a basic income, funded by helicopter drops.

=== In the Eurozone ===
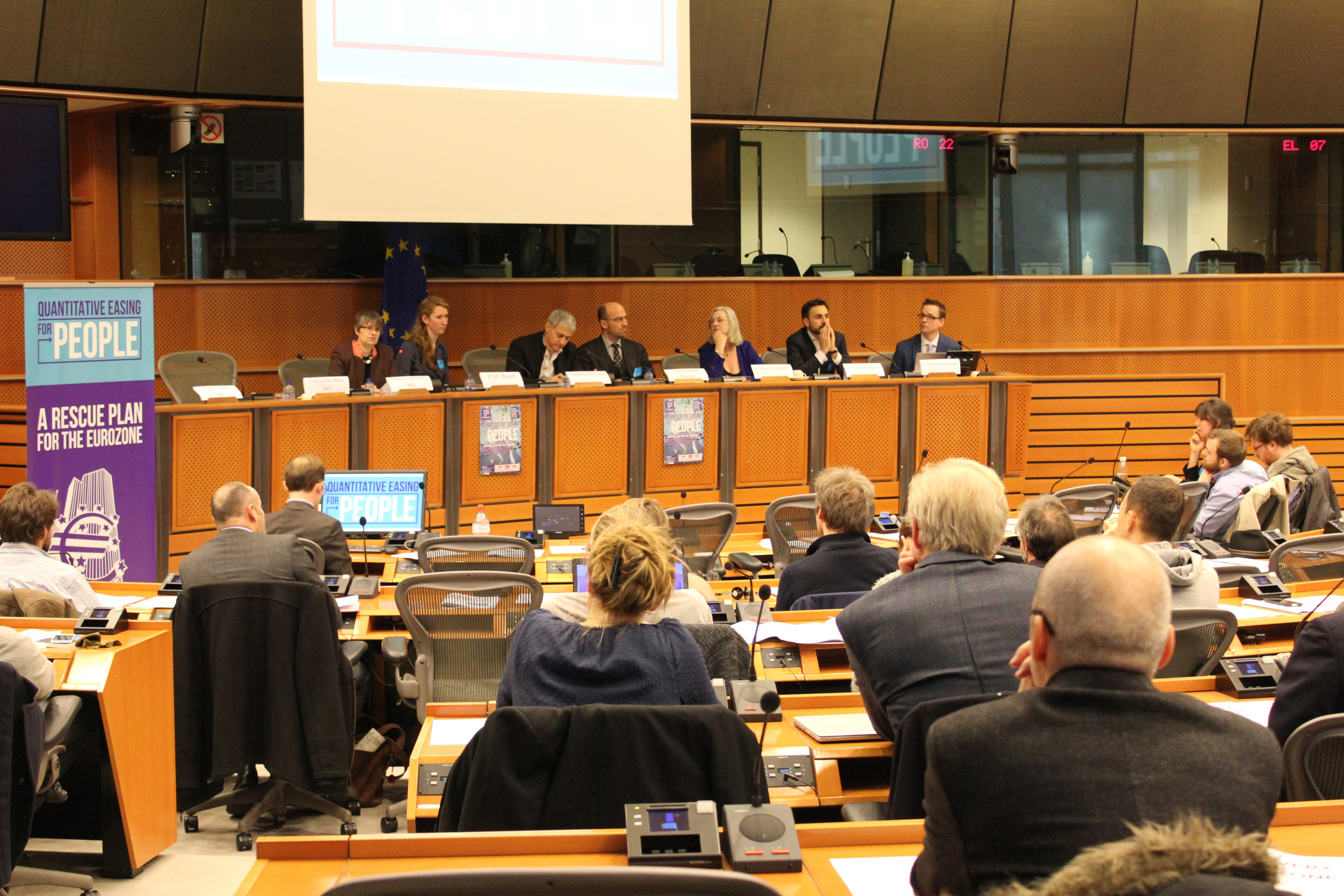
Conference on "QE for People" organised at the European parliament by Positive Money (17 February 2016)

On 10 March 2016, the idea became increasingly popular in Europe after Mario Draghi the President of the European Central Bank, said in a press conference that he found the concept "very interesting". This statement was followed by another statement from the ECB's Peter Praet who declared:

Yes, all central banks can do it. You can issue currency and you distribute it to people. That’s helicopter money. Helicopter money is giving to the people part of the net present value of your future seigniorage, the profit you make on the future banknotes. The question is, if and when is it opportune to make recourse to that sort of instrument which is really an extreme sort of instrument.

In 2015, a European campaign called "Quantitative Easing for People" was launched and is effectively promoting the concept of Helicopter Money, along with other proposals for "Green QE" and "Strategic QE", which are other types of monetary financing operations by central banks involving public investment programmes. The campaign was supported by 20 organisations across Europe and more than 116 economists.

On 17 June 2016, 18 Members of the European Parliament (including Philippe Lamberts, Paul Tang and Fabio De Masi) signed an open letter calling on the ECB to "provide evidence-based analysis of the potential effects of the alternative proposals mentioned above, and to clarify under which conditions their implementation would be legal". If it doesn't consider alternatives to QE, MEPs fear the ECB would leave itself "unprepared for a deterioration in economic conditions".

In October 2016, a survey showed that 54% Europeans think helicopter money would be a good idea, with only 14% against.

In 2020, politicians, civil society organisations and economists debated issuing helicopter money as a response to the coronavirus pandemic in Europe. While the ECB president Christine Lagarde insisted the ECB had not considered helicopter money, a group of 8 MEPs from different groups (including Guy Verhofstadt) said in a letter to the ECB President that it was "rather surprising to read your emphatic response" and asked the ECB to provide further analysis on this notion.

In 2021, the French Conseil d'Analyse Économique (economic advisory council), an advisory body attached to the Prime minister's office, recommended the inclusion of helicopter money in the ECB's toolbox.

=== In the US ===
In 2020, the United States Congress debated issuing two times a $1,000 check to each eligible adult citizen, described by media as "helicopter money", as a response to the US coronavirus pandemic.

=== In Japan ===
In a meeting with Japanese Prime Minister Shinzo Abe and Bank of Japan's Haruhiko Kuroda in July 2016 it was widely reported that former Federal Reserve chairman Ben Bernanke advised the policy of monetizing more government debt created to fund infrastructure projects, ostensibly as a way to drop "helicopter money" on Japan to stimulate the economy and halt deflation in Japan. Financial markets began to front-run this stimulus effort days before it was announced when accounts of Bernanke's visit to Japan were first reported. Japan had already before given consumption vouchers in 1999 to citizens.

Later in the month the Bank of Japan in an ongoing review of its monetary stimulus program was reported to be considering policies somewhat similar to "helicopter money", such as selling 50-year or perpetual bonds. However, even if the central bank commits to hold these 50-year government bonds for a very long time, that is not helicopter money as long as this money, financed by the state (debt) and not by central bank money printing per se, is not distributed to households directly.

=== Switzerland ===
In October 2020, a Swiss popular initiative was started in an attempt to trigger a national referendum obliging the Swiss National Bank to distribute a 7500 CHF dividend to all Swiss citizens. Citizens have until April 2022 to collect the 100,000 required signatures.

=== Popular culture ===
Comedy heavy metal band Nanowar of Steel cited the helicopter drop monetary policy in their financial-epic-metal song "Tooth Fairy".

== Criticism ==
=== Substitution to fiscal policy ===
Many economists would argue that helicopter money, in the form of cash transfers to households, should not be seen as a substitute for fiscal policy. Given the government's borrowing costs are extremely low at close to zero interest rates, conventional fiscal stimulus through tax cuts and infrastructure spending should work. From this perspective, helicopter money is really an insurance policy against the failure of fiscal policy for political, legal or institutional reasons.

Helicopter money advocates argue that having the central bank supervise directly the transfers is likely to work better in certain circumstances. For example, economists Xavier Jaravel and Johannes Boehm argue that "monetary policymakers can act faster and are less likely to overshoot, given their inflation mandate. Politicians, on the other hand, may be tempted to launch aggressive stimulus policies that could prove difficult to reverse."

=== Inflationary effect ===
In the past the idea had been dismissed because it was thought that it would inevitably lead to hyperinflation.

Consequently, a range of concerns include the fact that helicopter money would undermine trust in the currency (which ultimately would lead to hyperinflation). This concern was particularly voiced by German Economist (and former Chief Economist at the ECB) Otmar Issing in a paper written in 2014. Later in 2016, he declared in an interview: "I think the whole idea of the helicopter money is downright devastating. For this is nothing more than a declaration of bankruptcy of the monetary policy" Richard Koo makes a similar argument when saying "if such envelopes arrived day after day, the entire country would quickly fall into a panic as people lose all sense of what their currency is worth".

A study published by the French Economic Advisory Council estimates that 1% of GDP equivalent of helicopter money transfers in the Eurozone would generate around 0.5% of inflation over one year.

=== Low consumption rate ===
Several prominent economists such as central banker Raghuram Rajan are against helicopter money on the grounds that helicopter money would be ineffective because its broad class distribution would mean the recipients would not spend much of the money. In response, Lord Adair Turner argues: "Money-financed deficits will always stimulate nominal demand. By comparison debt finance deficits might do so, but might not."

Contradicting this argument, several surveys conducted in the Eurozone concluded however that between 30 and 55% of the distributed money would be spent by households, in effect resulting in a boost of around 2% of GDP. The most recent research on this topic was carried out by the Austrian central bank, and concludes that in the Eurozone the average marginal propensity to consume is around 50%, which is higher than previous research found.

=== "No free lunch" ===
Another range of critics involve the idea that there cannot be such thing as "free money" or as economists say "there is no such thing as a free lunch". This criticism was notably expressed by Bank for International Settlements researchers Claudio Borio, Piti Disyatat and Anna Zabai, who claimed that helicopter drops to citizens would necessarily entail payment by the central bank of interest on the extra reserves being supplied.

In a response, the former IMF economist Biagio Bossone challenges the later assumption and argues that "helicopter money is a 'free lunch' in the simple sense that, if it works and succeeds in closing the output gap, people won’t have to repay it through higher taxes or undesired (above optimal) inflation".

=== Legality ===
Other critics claim helicopter money would be outside of the mandate of central banks, because it would "blur the lines between fiscal policy and monetary policy" mainly because helicopter money would involve "fiscal effects", which is traditionally the role of governments to decide on. However advocates of helicopter money such as Eric Lonergan and Simon Wren-Lewis pointed out that standard monetary policy tools also have fiscal effects.

=== Accounting and implications for central bank balance sheets ===
One of the main concerns with transfers from the central bank directly to the private sector is that in contrast to conventional open-market operations the central bank does not have an asset corresponding to the base money created. This has implications for the measured equity of the central bank because base money is typically treated as a liability, but it could also constrain the central bank's ability to set interest rates in the future.

For this reason, Bundesbank president Jens Weidmann also voiced opposition against helicopter money, arguing it would "tear gaping holes in central bank balance sheets. Ultimately, it would be down to the euro-area countries, and thus the taxpayer, to shoulder the costs because central banks would be unprofitable for quite some time." The National Bank of Belgium also released a paper making a similar argument.

However, more conventional instruments, like TLTROs and quantitative easing can also result in important losses on central banks' balance sheets. During the period 2022–2024, Eurozone central banks made losses to the tune of 160 billion euros as a consequence of the ECB's rates hikes.

The accounting treatment of central banks' balance sheets is controversial. Most economists now recognize that the 'capital' of the central bank is not really important. What matters is whether expansion of base money can be reversed in the future, or there are other means to raise interest rates. Various options have been proposed. Oxford professor, Simon Wren-Lewis has suggested that the government pre-commit to providing the Bank of England with bonds if needed.

The European Central Bank can, in fact, mandate an increase in its capital, and the introduction of tiered reserves and interest on reserves gives central banks an array of tools to protect their own net income and the demand for reserves.

=== Threat to central bank independence ===
Endra Curren and Ben Holland of Bloomberg stated "That type of stimulus [helicopter money] used to be taboo, in part because it risks eroding the independence from politics that monetary policy makers prize [...] History is littered with cautionary tales in which blurring the lines between central bank and Treasury coffers led to runaway inflation."

== See also ==
- Monetary policy
