= Positive Money =

Not-for-profit advocacy group

- Formation: 2010; 16 years ago
- Type: Non-governmental organisation
- Legal status: Company limited by guarantee
- Headquarters: London, United Kingdom
- Chair of the Board: Sian Williams
- Key people: Ben Dyson (founder)
- Affiliations: Finance Watch
- Budget: 480,000 GBP (2019)
- Staff: 10 (2020)
- Website: www.positivemoney.org

Positive Money is a not-for-profit advocacy group based in London and Brussels that campaigns for monetary reform. Founded in 2010, the organization promotes central bank reforms and alternative monetary policy, with a focus on what it terms "sovereign money" systems.

== History ==
Positive Money was founded in London by Ben Dyson in 2010 as a response to the 2008 financial crisis. In its early years, Positive Money focused its efforts in advocating for a fundamental reform of the United Kingdom's monetary system, focusing on how money is created in the economy.

Early work centered on education about fractional-reserve banking and disconnecting private banks from money creation. Dyson criticized the banking sector's role in housing unaffordability, with financial instability leading to inequality.

In 2013, Fran Boait became executive director, marking a significant shift in the organisation's approach. Under Boait's leadership, Positive Money broadened its scope beyond fundamental monetary reform to include pragmatic policy proposals. These include advocacy for digital currencies, monetary financing proposals such as "People's Quantitative Easing" and "helicopter money", and environmental use of monetary policy through "green quantitative easing".

Positive Money stated that QE was ineffective in boosting GDP. Positive Money also adopted new tactics such as rallies in front of the Bank of England and petitioning. In 2013, Positive Money initiated the International Movement for Monetary Reform, a worldwide network of likeminded organisations.

In 2015, Positive money started its international expansion by launching a Eurozone-wide campaign on "Quantitative Easing for the People". Positive money registered as a lobby group in the EU institutions in Brussels and in 2018 it formally created Positive Money Europe to operate the group's campaigns towards the European Central Bank and the European Parliament. In December 2019, Positive Money Europe was able to meet with the ECB President Christine Lagarde.

In 2016 Positive money founder Ben Dyson joined the Bank of England as a researcher, and he continued to work on Central Bank Digital Currency. In 2020, he joined the Bank for International Settlements and works on Project Nexus cross-border payment systems.

In early 2021, the Bank of England announced it would incorporate environmental considerations in its corporate quantitative easing programme following advocacy by groups including Positive Money.

== Proposals ==
=== Sovereign money ===
Positive Money's historical backbone proposal is to introduce a "sovereign money system". Under such a reform, private banks would be deprived from their ability to create money by extending credit into the economy. In turn, the Bank of England would regain the monopoly over money creation, by financing the government's budget (monetary financing) or distributing a citizens' dividend ("helicopter money"). While some Positive Money advocates also endorse Modern Monetary Theory, MMT claims that money is already issued as sovereign currency.

Although Positive Money's proposal is similar to full-reserve banking or narrow banking, it differs in the sense that it would merge bank deposits and central bank money. As explained by former Positive Money researcher Frank van Lerven, "Under a Sovereign Money system, there is no longer a split circulation of money, just one integrated quantity of money circulating among banks and non-banks alike." According to former ECB Vice-president Vitor Constancio, Positive Money's proposal "would not create enough funding for investment and growth."

=== Other proposals ===
Over the years, Positive Money has broadened its agenda towards somewhat more short-term proposals such as:

- Fiscal-monetary cooperation: the organisation proposes various ways to channel money created by central banks towards public spending and investment.
- Reforming the governance and accountability frameworks of the Bank of England and of the European Central Bank.
- Greening monetary policy: Aligning monetary policy with climate change objectives though reforms of central bank's collateral framework or forms of credit guidance such as green TLTROs.
- Digital currency: the organisation propose implementing a central bank digital currency in the UK and supports the introduction of a digital euro by the ECB.

== Positive Money Europe ==
Positive Money Europe
- Formation: 2018; 8 years ago
- Type: Non-governmental organisation
- Legal status: ASBL
- Headquarters: Brussels, Belgium
- Executive Director: Aurélie Maréchal
- Chair of the Board: Jill Warren
- Budget: 140,000 EUR (2019)
- Staff: 7 (2020)
- Website: www.positivemoney.eu

Positive Money Europe was established in Brussels in 2018.

They work on monetary policy focussing on the European Central Bank (ECB), European Union financial policy, sustainable finance, energy prices, climate change and the development of public digital money.

Positive Money Europe was established in 2018, following the development of the Quantitative Easing for People campaign that advocated changes to the European Central Bank's quantitative easing policies, arguing that monetary policy should more directly benefit households and the wider economy.

==== Energy crisis and monetary policy advocacy (2022–2024) ====
Following Russia's invasion of Ukraine in 2022 and the subsequent European energy crisis, Positive Money Europe expanded its work on the relationship between energy prices, inflation and monetary policy.

In 2022, the organisation delivered a petition containing approximately 58,000 signatures to the European Central Bank as part of its Unlock campaign. The campaign called for financial measures to support energy-efficient building renovations and reduce European households' exposure to energy price volatility.

The organisation promoted the introduction of differentiated interest rates, green dual rates, under which financing for certain environmentally sustainable investments would be available at lower borrowing costs.

In December 2023 French President Emmanuel Macron discussed differentiated interest rates for green investment during the COP28 climate conference.

In 2024, Positive Money Europe published research examining inflation as an ecological phenomenon. The research explored how dependence on fossil fuels, climate change and environmental degradation can contribute to price instability, including through mechanisms described as fossilflation and climateflation.

==== Financial regulation and monetary policy developments (2025–2026) ====
In collaboration with WWF's Greening Financial Regulation Initiative, Positive Money Europe published research examining the role of the European Central Bank's collateral framework in addressing climate change and biodiversity loss.

The research proposed changes that would reduce financial incentives for environmentally harmful activities while supporting the transition towards more sustainable investment.

In 2025, the ECB introduced changes to its collateral framework that reflected aspects of the recommendations advocated by Positive Money Europe and other environmental organisations. More changes followed in 2026.

=== Policy areas and activities ===
==== Green monetary policy ====
The organisation advocates incorporating climate-related and environmental risks into central bank operations, including asset purchases, collateral frameworks and financial risk assessments.

Its research also examines how monetary policy can affect the financing of renewable energy, energy efficiency and other investments associated with the transition to a low-carbon economy.

==== Digital euro ====
Positive Money Europe has participated in European policy discussions concerning the digital euro since 2020 and supports the introduction of a publicly issued digital form of central bank money.

Its policy proposals have emphasised accessibility, privacy protection, free basic services for users and distribution through a variety of intermediaries, potentially including public institutions and non-bank providers. In 2026, the Financial Times discussed the importance of a European public infrastructure for the digital euro after US financial sanctions disabled banking services for officials of international courts resident in the Eurozone. Throughout the legislative discussions in 2025 and 2026, Positive Money Europe engaged with EU policymakers and contributed research and commentary on the proposed digital currency.

==== Energy prices and renewable electricity ====
In 2026, the organisation published Towards Cheaper Electricity: Moving Europe from Gas to Renewables, examining the potential for wind and solar energy to reduce electricity costs and limit exposure to fossil fuel price volatility.

The report received extensive coverage in European news media and contributed to discussions about the economic implications of Europe's energy transition.

==== Inflation and environmental risks ====
Positive Money Europe's research has examined the extent to which inflation can result from structural factors beyond conventional monetary demand pressures including fossil fuel dependence, environmental degradation and climate-related disruptions.

== Reception and criticism ==
Positive Money's proposals created significant debate in financial, academic, and policy communities. Supporters argue the proposals address fundamental flaws in the monetary system that contribute to financial instability, income inequality, and unsustainable energy production.

Critics raise concerns about sovereign money systems. Mainstream economists argue removing banks' money creation could constrain credit and investment. Critics also claim it could stimulate expansion of shadow banking.

The organization's more pragmatic proposals received broader support and central banks have partially adopted green monetary policy.

== See also ==
- 2018 Swiss sovereign-money initiative
- Chicago plan
- Sustainable finance
- Fractional-reserve banking
- Helicopter money
- Monetary financing
- Monetary Policy
- Monetary reform in Britain
- Monetary reform
- Money creation
- People's Quantitative Easing
