= Monetary sovereignty =

Exclusive legal control over a currency

Monetary sovereignty is the power of the state to exercise exclusive legal control over its currency and monetary policy. This includes the authority to designate a country's legal tender, control the money supply, set interest rates, and regulate financial institutions. Monetary sovereignty is crucial for national sovereignty, economic independence, and policy autonomy.

The degree of monetary sovereignty ranges widely from countries with high control over monetary systems to those who voluntarily gave up aspects to supranational organizations or adopted a foreign currency.

== Definitions ==
Monetary sovereignty has several key powers:

Legal tender authority: the exclusive authority to designate which forms of payment are legally acceptable for settling debts in a nation. This includes determining the official currency.

Issuance and retirement: the exclusive authority to control legal tender issuance and retirement.

Monetary policy independence: The ability to set interest rates and determine bank reserve requirements without external interference. This power includes responding to economic conditions with expansionary or contractionary measures.

Exchange rate management: The authority to set exchange rate policies, whether fixed or floating, and intervene in foreign exchange markets.

Financial system regulation: The power to regulate banks and other financial institutions, including acting as a lender of last resort, setting capital requirements, and supervising financial markets.

== Contemporary examples ==
=== High monetary sovereignty ===
Nations such as the United States, Japan, and the United Kingdom have high monetary sovereignty. They have autonomous central banks that can respond to economic conditions without external constraints and independently set monetary policy.

=== Shared monetary sovereignty ===
The European Union represents voluntary monetary sovereignty sharing. 20 member nations adopted the euro and transferred substantial powers to the European Central Bank. These countries have some fiscal sovereignty but gave up the ability to independently adjust the money supply, set interest rates, or devalue the currency.

=== Limited monetary sovereignty ===
Currency boards or dollarization significantly limit monetary sovereignty. Argentina's Convertibility plan had pegged the peso to the dollar. Ecuador and El Salvador adopted the US dollar.

== Challenges to monetary sovereignty ==
=== Globalization and capital flows ===
International capital mobility can constrain monetary sovereignty. Capital flows across borders can reduce monetary policy effectiveness.

=== Digital currencies and cryptocurrencies ===
Digital currencies, including central bank digital currencies (CBDCs) and private cryptocurrencies, challenge monetary sovereignty. These technologies could allow currency competition and cross-border payments bypassing traditional monetary controls.

=== International monetary cooperation ===
The International Monetary Fund can impose conditions limiting monetary sovereignty. Monetary policy often requires international cooperation.

== Sovereign money creation ==
=== Current money creation system ===
Money can be created by both central banks and commercial banks. Central banks create base money through open market operations, lending to commercial banks, and other mechanisms. Commercial banks create money through fractional reserve banking when they extend loans. Most money is created by commercial banks through loans. In 2014, the Bank of England explained that commercial bank deposits made up 97% of the broad money supply, with only 3% consisting of central bank-issued notes and coins.

=== International experiences ===
Organizations like Positive Money advocate for central banks exclusively managing money creation. This would replace using interest rates to influence commercial bank money creation. Sovereign money reform proponents argue for money creation that benefits the general public not private banks. They say commercial banks can create money for profit while the public bears financial instability risk. Proponents argue for democratic oversight over money creation, for public purposes like education, healthcare, or basic income.

Critics question the feasibility of a transition to a sovereign money system. They argue sovereign money would not prevent asset bubbles financed by existing surplus funds in money markets.

The 2018 Swiss sovereign-money initiative was a popular reform attempt but did not succeed. After the 2008–2011 Icelandic financial crisis, the prime minister commissioned a study of banking system reforms by Frosti Sigurjónsson, who proposed sovereign money reform. The Ons Geld citizens initiative in the Netherlands launched in 2015 gathered over 120,000 signatures.

== See also ==
- 2018 Swiss sovereign-money initiative
- Federal Open Market Committee - 7 Board of Governors appointed by the president and 5 from the Federal Reserve Banks
- Money creation
- Modern Monetary Theory
- Positive Money - UK based non-profit advocating for a sovereign monetary system
- Quantitative easing and Quantitative tightening
