= Stephen Zarlenga =

Financial researcher and author (1941–2017)

Stephen A. Zarlenga (1941 – 25 April 2017) was a researcher and author in the field of monetary theory, trader in stock and financial markets, and advocate of monetary reform.

== Biography ==
Zarlenga's parents Dino and Lisa emigrated from Italy during the Great Depression. He received a BA in psychology at the University of Chicago in 1963.

He worked in the fields of mutual fund investing, commodity trading, real estate, and insurance. In 1996, he founded the American Monetary Institute, established as a 4947(a)(1) trust, dedicated to the "independent study of monetary history, theory and reform." He authored numerous articles and books, and gave lectures, participated in conferences and gave testimony to government committees, on "monetary reform."

He served as director of the American Monetary Institute (AMI) until his death.

== Theories on money and banking ==
Zarlenga argued that, in a world where "the nature of money is a fiat of the law, an invention or creation of mankind," even in times of the gold standard, (Note: "History shows the so-called gold standard has been a shell game and a ruse and a tool of plutocracy," where, historically, there has always been more gold-backed notes than the gold to back them. See Zarlenga (2002a)) the authority to "create money" should be the sole prerogative of a sovereign government. He supported the distinctions made by 19th century author Henry George between wealth and money, (Note: "The laborer who receives his wages in money -coined or printed it may be- really receives in return for the addition his labour has made to the general stock of wealth, a draft on that general stock, which he may utilize… and that neither the money, which is but the draft, nor the particular form of wealth which he uses it to call for, represents advances of capital for his maintenance." See George (1997)) between money and credit, and between what George had called "privately-created credit, used in place of money and for private profit" and "government- or publicly- created money for the common good."

Hence, Zarlenga's support for the incorporation of the Federal Reserve System, which he considered to be a "private institution," (Note: For the Federal Reserve System's position on the nature of the institution, see FRBSF (2003); FRS (2017)) into the U.S. Treasury, "where all new money would be created by government as money, not interest-bearing debt", and "the nationalization of the monetary system," (Note: Though not the nationalization of the banking and the financial services sectors. See Zarlenga (2009)) thus ending fractional banking. In an article published in the Barnes Review, to which he also reviewed publications, he blamed the hyperinflation in Weimar Germany on "the privately controlled Reichsbank that created "far too many German marks."

He wrote numerous articles on the subject of monetary reform along these lines, and, in 2002, authored the book The Lost Science of Money, first published in German in 1999, as Der Mythos Vom Geld – Die Geschichte Der Macht (The Mythology Of Money – The Story Of Power), where he also criticized the European common-currency regime.

== Activism ==
Zarlenga actively supported monetary-reform legislation in the United States, appearing and giving testimony in government agencies, and in the House of Lords, UK. Democratic congressman Dennis Kucinich from Ohio introduced in 2010 a bill for the National Employment Emergency Defense Act, the text of which was based on a text earlier developed by Zarlenga, the so-called "American Monetary Act." The bill was eventually not introduced to the floor, since there were no other co-sponsors and no companion legislation in the Senate.

In 2004, Zarlenga organized AMI's first Monetary Reform Conference, which became an annual event.

== Support ==
Zarlenga's views are supported by numerous people, including Post-Keynesians such as Australian Steve Keen and American Michael Hudson, and mainstream economists such as German former banker Michael Kumhof who found The Lost Science to be "a masterful work." The London-based organization Positive Money is promoting the views held by Zarlenga, while in June 2018, a referendum was held in Switzerland on a proposal to "eliminate bank-created money." The proposal was defeated "in a landslide" with approximately 76% of voters against it.

In 2010, and again in 2016, the Green Party, US adopted in its platform on the economy proposals in line with Zarlenga's ideas on the nationalization of the Fed, the elimination of fractional banking, the creation by the state of so-called "debt-free money" only, etc.

== Criticism ==
Austrian economists fundamentally disagree with nationalizations of any sectors of the economy and, thus, oppose Zarlenga's proposals to "nationalize central banks," such as the Fed in the U.S., which is presumed to be a private enterprise.

Although Zarlenga's history of fiat money was in line with heterodox analysis and especially Post-Keynesian, his notions of "sovereign money" aka "debt-free money," and the opposition to fractional banking have been criticized severely, especially the "refusal" to acknowledge that "all money is a liability of the issuing state."

Critics state that "debt-free money" advocates are "confused on the accounting, vague on the terminology, and rarely provide details on their proposal" and point out that the suggestion to have, for example in the United States, the central bank, instead of providing the government with a "loan", simply "transfer[ing]" money to the government's account with the Fed, (Note: "[And] treating those transfers as gifts". See Wray (2015-16)) would not make money “debt-free” because the Fed's liabilities grow: first, in the form of Treasury deposits, and, then, as the Treasury draws down those deposits, in the form of bank reserves. And they note that the Fed would continue to pay interest on reserves in order to control the interest rate. In the critics' words, "debt-free money" can never be either debt-free or interest-free and the positions advocated by Zarlenga and supporters of "sovereign money" would only be "logically consistent" with zero interest-rates in the economy "forever."

== Selected works ==
- "Germany's 1923 Hyperinflation: A "Private" Affair" (PDF). Barnes Review. V (4): 61–67. July–August 1999.
- "A Deeper Look Into Tragedy and Hope". Barnes Review. VI (1): 39–46. January–February 2000.
- "Henry George's Concept of Money". Speech at the Economic Justice & Green Movement Conference; Council of Georgist Organizations, London, Ontario, Canada, 24 August 2002. American Monetary Institute. 2002a.
- The Lost Science of Money: The Mythology of Money, The Story of Power. USA: American Monetary Institute. 2002b. ISBN 978-1930748033.
- "The Lost Science of Money: A Solution to the States' Fiscal Crises". Speech at the U.S Treasury, 4 December 2003. American Monetary Institute. 2003.
- "The Lost Science of Money & Monetary Justice Using Government Created Money to Fund Public Projects". Talk At The House of Lords, London, UK, 4 May 2004. 2004.
- "Moving Monetary Reform to the 'Front Burner'" (PDF). American Review of Political Economy. 3 (1): 39–84. March 2005.
- "Presenting the American Monetary Act" (PDF). American Monetary Institute. 2009.
- (with Poteat, Robert) "The Nature of Money in Modern Economy – Implications and Consequences" (PDF). Journal of King Abdulaziz University: Islamic Economics. 29 (2): 57–73. July 2016.

== See also ==
- NEED Act
- American Monetary Institute
- Money creation
- Credit theory of money
- The Chicago Plan Revisited
- Full-reserve banking
- Modern Monetary Theory
- Monetarism
- Commodity money
- Michael Rowbotham

== Sources ==
- Bosley, Catherine (10 June 2018). "Swiss Voters Reject Radical Sovereign Money Plan in Landslide". Bloomberg.
- George, Henry (1997) [1879]. Progress and Poverty: An Inquiry in the Cause of Industrial Depressions and of Increase of Want with Increase of Wealth. New York: Robert Schalkenbach Foundation. ISBN 978-0911312584.
- Grussner, Kaj (18 February 2010). "The Dangers of Monetary Reform". Speech at the U.S Treasury, 4 December 2003. The Mises Institute.
- Kumhof, Michael; Benes, Jaromir (1 August 2002). "The Chicago Plan Revisited". IRS.
- McDougall, Mary; Riley, Charles (10 June 2018). "Swiss vote down 'dangerous' overhaul of banks". Bloomberg. Archived from the original on June 11, 2018.
- Mosler, Warren (7 December 2010). "U.S. Green Party takes historic monetary step". Center of the Unniverse.
- Wray, L. Randall (19 December 2015). "Debt-Feee Money, part I: Banana republics". New Economic Perspectives.
  - Wray, L. Randall (23 December 2015). "Debt-Feee Money, part II: Banana republics". New Economic Perspectives.
  - Wray, L. Randall (14 February 2016). "Debt-Feee Money, part III: The Value of Redemption". New Economic Perspectives.
  - Wray, L. Randall (15 February 2016). "Debt-Feee Money, part IV: American Colonial Currency". New Economic Perspectives.
- Fullwiler, Scott (3 July 2014). "Debt-Free Money and ZIRP Forever". New Economic Perspectives.

=== Institutional ===
- "Is the Federal Reserve a privately owned corporation?". Federal Reserve Bank of San Francisco. September 2003.
- "A Celebration of the Life and Work of Stephen Zarlenga". American Monetary Institute. 2017.
- "Who owns the Federal Reserve?". FRS. March 2017.
- "2016 Platform: IV. Economic Justice & Sustainability". Green Party, US. 2016.
