= Committee on Monetary and Economic Reform =

The Committee on Monetary and Economic Reform (COMER) is a Canadian economics-oriented think tank, publishing house, and education centre based in Toronto, Ontario. Founded in 1988, the organization advocates for monetary reform, criticizing what it views as Canada's abandonment of monetary sovereignty.

== History ==
COMER was co-founded in 1988 by William Krehm and economist John Hotson amid concern about Canada's "debt-based monetary system," which they argued was unsustainable. Responding to rising interest rates, monetarist economics, and a "zero inflation" campaign, the organization proposed alternative systems. The policy-oriented think tank advocates for 100% reserve banking like the Chicago Plan.

== Organization ==
As of 2015, Ann Emmett was the chair of the organization. COMER argues for a mixed economy and changes in monetary policy through what it argues is the mandate under the Bank of Canada Act.

The group's research and publications focus on monetary sovereignty, the central bank mandate, and the relationship between government debt and money creation. COMER is part of a resurgence of interest in fundamental financial reform.

== Core positions ==
COMER claimed that the Bank of Canada is mandated under the Bank of Canada Act to provide debt-free support for public projects undertaken by federal, provincial and city governments, as it did from its foundation in 1935 to 1974.

The organization argues Canada's decision to join the Bank for International Settlements (BIS) required the country to abandon direct government financing by its central bank. COMER argues this change transferred control of Canada's monetary policy from domestic institutions to "secret" deliberations of the private foreign bankers at the BIS.

== Lawsuit against Bank of Canada ==
=== Initial lawsuit (2011-2013) ===
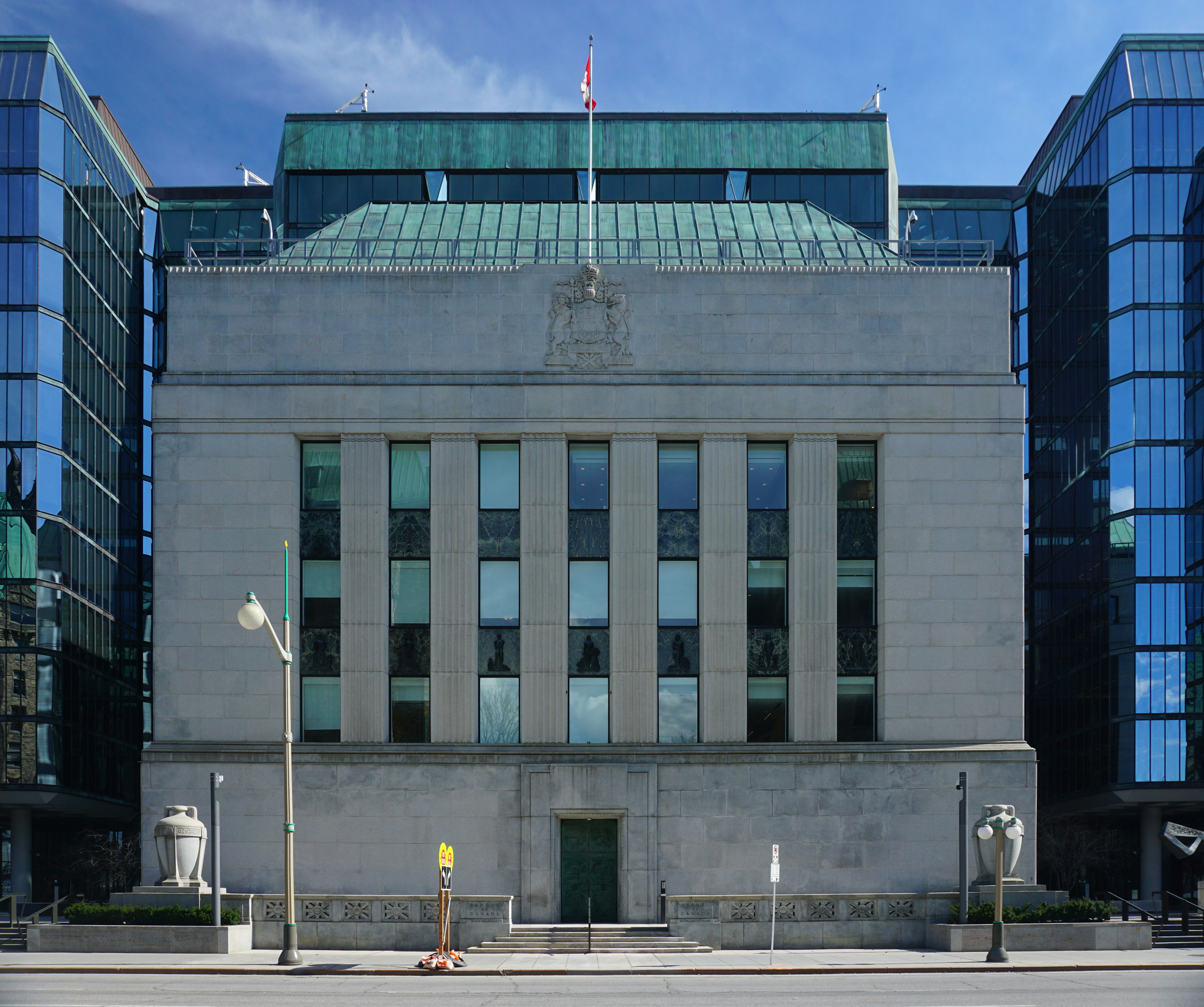
Bank of Canada Facade

In 2011, COMER brought a lawsuit against the Canadian government, represented by Rocco Galati. The legal action argued the country had unconstitutionally ceded its monetary sovereignty to foreign banking interests and sought the return of the Bank of Canada's pre-1974 direct government lending. However, on August 9, 2013, Prothonotary Kevin R. Aalto struck COMER's claim without leave to amend, though no costs were awarded against the organization.

=== Appeals process (2014-2017) ===
Despite the initial setback, COMER pursued multiple levels of appeal. In 2014 Federal Court Judge Russell ruled that the original claim should be struck entirely but granted leave for COMER to amend the claim.

Each party appealed different aspects of this ruling. On January 26, 2015, the Federal Court of Appeal heard the appeals, and dismissed both the appeal and cross-appeal without costs, giving COMER 60 days to file an amended claim.

COMER filed an amended statement of claim on March 26, 2015. The Crown sought to have this new claim struck as well. Following arguments heard by Justice Russell on October 14, 2015, the court delivered a decisive ruling on February 8, 2016, striking COMER's amended claim in its entirety and refusing any further leave to amend. This time, costs were awarded to the Crown.

In his ruling, Justice Russell emphatically stated that COMER's arguments convinced him "that, for reasons given, they have no scintilla of a cause of action that this Court can or should hear."

=== Final appeals (2016-2017) ===
Despite these setbacks, COMER continued its legal challenge. On March 3, 2016, the organization filed a notice of appeal with the Federal Court of Appeal. This appeal was heard on December 7, 2016, and was dismissed with costs awarded against COMER.

As a final measure, COMER filed an application for leave to appeal with the Supreme Court of Canada on February 1, 2017. On May 4, 2017, the Supreme Court dismissed this application, effectively ending COMER's legal challenge.

== See also ==
- American Monetary Institute
- Chicago plan
- Monetary sovereignty
- Bank for International Settlements
