= Monetary reform in the United States =

Reform of money supply and the banking system in the US

Monetary reform in the United States refers to proposals and movements to change how money is created and regulated in the financial system. Reform efforts have emerged periodically in US history due to concerns about economic stability, banking practices, debt, and concentrated power.

== History ==
=== Colonial era and early republic (1600-1860) ===
Colonial monetary systems were idiosyncratic, with individual colonies having their own currencies. This gave colonies significant economic independence.

The struggle for monetary control continued after independence. In 1781, the Bank of North America became the first incorporated bank in the United States, serving several functions of a central bank. After the Pennsylvania legislature annulled its charter in 1785, a later charter was limited to 14 years and $2 million total assets.

The Constitution granted Congress specific monetary powers, including "To coin Money, regulate the Value thereof". Thomas Jefferson argued the Constitution did not give Congress the power to establish a bank. Alexander Hamilton argued implied powers permitted it for the general welfare. This was followed by the First Bank of the United States (1791-1811), no central bank (1811-1816), the Second Bank of the United States (1816-1836).

President Andrew Jackson was a prominent critic of the central bank, arguing it concentrated financial power in a single institution and enriched wealthy interests with special privileges. He objected to it transferring power from elected officials to unelected bankers and foreign influence in monetary policy. Jackson's successful campaign against the Second Bank of the United States reflected broader populist monetary policy concerns.

In the "free banking" era from 1837-1862, anyone meeting minimum capital requirements could open a bank. Thousands of different bank notes circulated, making fraud difficult to prevent. This decentralized monetary experiment fed later debates about central control and innovation.

Regional monetary experiments included the Suffolk System, operating in New England from 1824-1858. This clearinghouse facilitated interbank payments, but it lacked money supply control. Upon statehood in 1837, Michigan permitted free banking until the system collapsed in 1839.

The Cincinnati Time Store was an 1820s alternative currency experiment where Josiah Warren used labor notes.

The Locofocos was a hard money faction of the Democratic Party that distrusted paper money and banks.

=== The path to the Federal Reserve (1860-1913) ===
The absence of a central bank during the mid-19th century led to frequent financial panics and economic instability, while also creating space for innovative monetary reform movements, including the Greenback movement, which emerged from American Civil War financing.

==== The Greenback Party ====
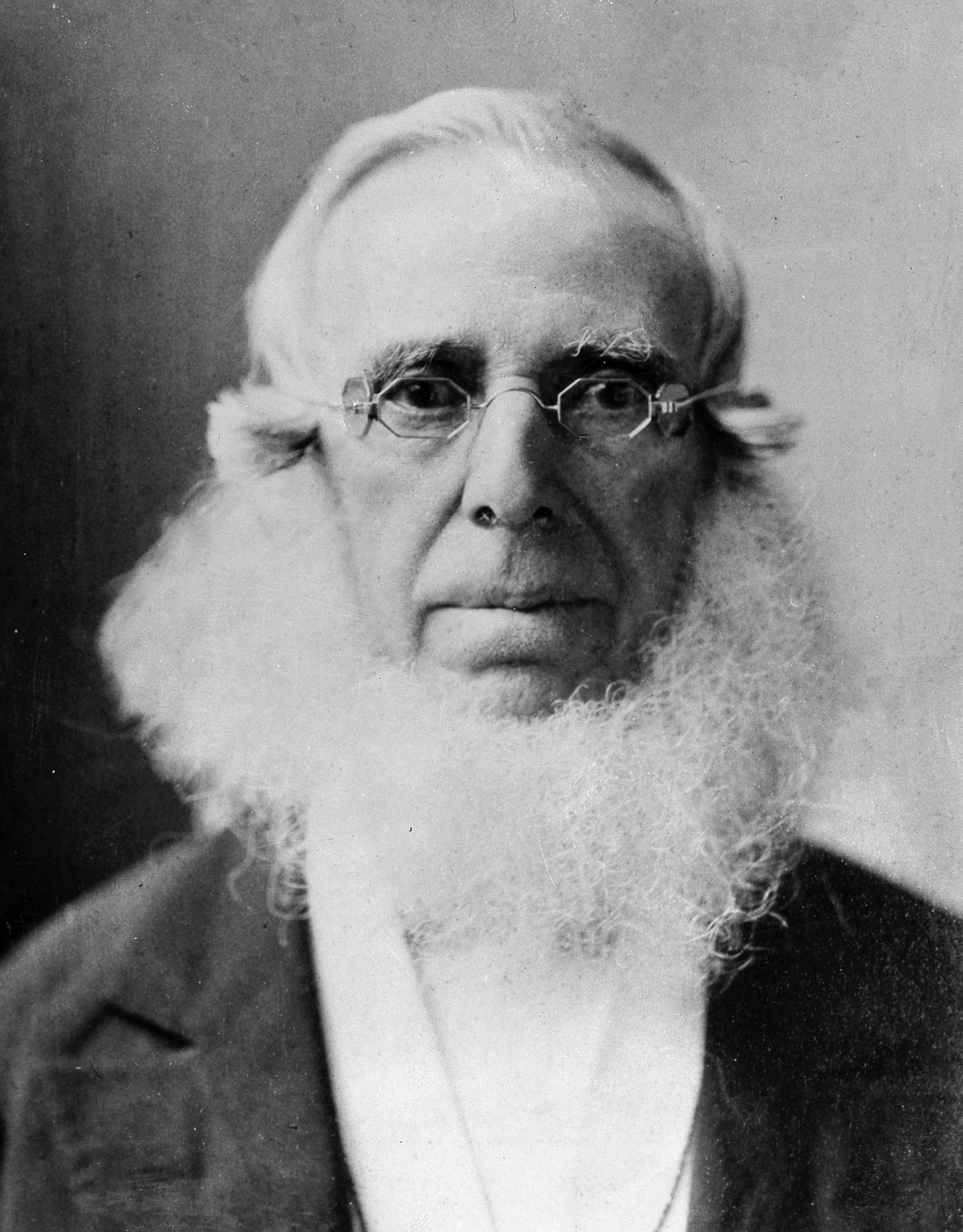
Peter Cooper, the Greenback Party's candidate in the 1876 presidential election.

During the Civil War, Congress passed the first Legal Tender Act on February 25, 1862, authorizing the issuance of $150 million in United States Notes. Between 1862 and 1865, the U.S. government issued more than $450 million in paper money not backed by gold to finance the war effort. These notes were called "greenbacks" because of their distinctive green ink.

The success of greenbacks in financing the war inspired a broader movement advocating continued use of fiat currency. Following the Panic of 1873, laborers, farmers, and businessmen organized the Greenback Party in Indiana in 1874 to urge the federal government to inflate the economy by expanding the money supply with greenbacks.

Farmers turned to third parties like the Greenback Party for economic relief and reduce the power of financial elites. They were concerned about falling prices, an inadequate money supply, and huge debt burdens. Eastern financial interests advocated for the gold standard to ensure currency stability and prevent inflation.

The Greenback Party achieved notable political success as a third party. The party's platform focused upon repeal of the Specie Payment Resumption Act and use of non-gold-backed United States Notes. In 1876, they nominated Peter Cooper for president, and merging with labor reform groups in 1878 they polled a million votes and won 14 seats in Congress. In 1880, the Greenback Party nominated James B. Weaver, receiving just over 300,000 votes.

===== Financial panics and the push for central banking =====
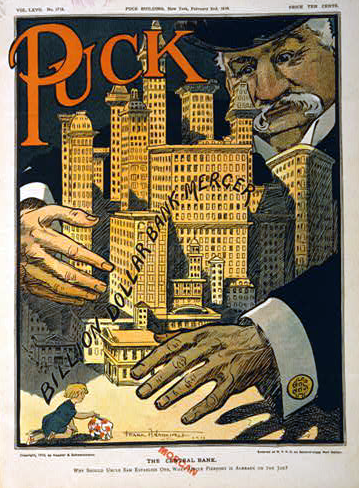
A cartoon on the cover of Puck titled: "The Central Bank--Why should Uncle Sam establish one, when Uncle Pierpont is already on the job?"

In the 1890s, the People's Party opposed the gold standard and demanded monetary reforms including unlimited silver coinage. The 1892 platform addressed silver demonetization, and James B. Weaver, the People's Party nominee, received over 8% of the Presidential vote, winning 5 states. Silver advocates called it "the people's money." George Shibley, an official with American Bimetallic Union and an activist in the cause of proportional representation, authored several books on monetary reform at the turn of the century, such as The money question, The financial plank of the allied reform parties for 1900, and How the new currency law affects me, with explanations.

In 1890 the Sherman Silver Purchase Act passed, requiring the Treasury to buy 4.5 million ounces of silver each month and issue new Notes redeemable for silver or gold. Speculators redeemed Notes for gold leading to the Panic of 1893 and the repeal of the Sherman Silver Purchase Act. Despite the famous Cross of Gold speech, William Jennings Bryan lost the 1896 election, ending silver's role as an official currency in the United States.

The continued absence of a central bank led to recurring financial crises throughout the late 19th century. The Panic of 1907 showed the need for a more stable monetary system as a credit crunch dried up business funding sources. J.P. Morgan functioned as a one-man central bank, spurring interest in establishing a central bank.

A key moment in American monetary history occurred in November 1910, when Senator Nelson W. Aldrich, Assistant Secretary of the Treasury A. Piatt Andrew, and financiers Frank A. Vanderlip, Henry Pomeroy Davison, Benjamin Strong Jr., and Paul Warburg met at the Jekyll Island Club to discuss monetary reform. This secretive meeting produced the initial draft legislation, which shared key aspects with the Federal Reserve Act. The Federal Reserve System represented a compromise between a centralized system and diffused control, with twelve regional Federal Reserve Banks overseen by a Board of Governors.

=== The Great Depression and the Chicago Plan (1913-1945) ===
The Great Depression of the 1930s sparked intense debate about monetary policy and banking reform. The most significant proposal to emerge from this period was the Chicago Plan, developed by economists at the University of Chicago. The plan proposed ending fractional reserve banking by requiring banks to hold 100% reserves against demand deposits, effectively separating money creation from commercial banking.

Proponents argued that this reform would reduce the severity of business cycles, eliminate bank runs, and give government greater control over the money supply. While the plan was not implemented, it continues to be referenced by reform advocates.

=== Post-war developments (1945-2008) ===
The Bretton Woods system tied the dollar to gold and other currencies to the dollar. The system collapsed in 1971 when President Nixon ended gold convertibility, leading to the fiat era.

=== Post-2008 financial crisis ===
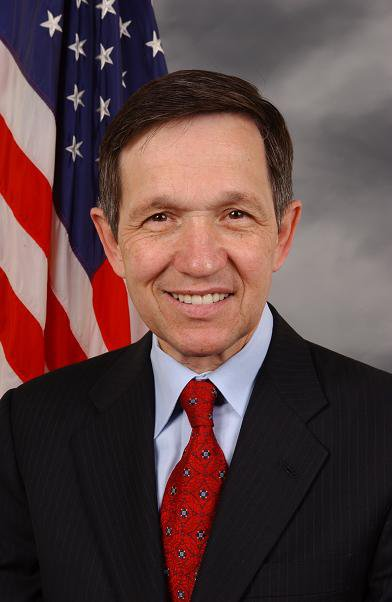
Dennis Kucinich, official portrait, 112th congress.

The 2008 financial crisis revealed major banks had taken excessive risks, with taxpayer bailouts protecting "too big to fail" financial institutions while bank profits remained privatized. Massive Federal Reserve interventions during and after the crisis, like quantitative easing, raised questions about the central bank's role and independence.

On the progressive left, Dennis Kucinich introduced the NEED Act, which would transfer money creation from private banks to the US Treasury. On the libertarian right, Ron Paul advocated for returning to the gold standard and "End the Fed."

Bitcoin critics say its significant price fluctuations make it unsuitable as the mainstream payment method worldwide, suggesting a cryptocurrency based on special drawing rights, though wide use of cryptocurrency could create systemic risk.

== See also ==
- Monetary policy of the United States
- Monetary reform in Britain
- New Economy movement
- Black Friday (1869) - also referred to as the Gold Panic of 1869
