= Kucinich Resolution =

The term Kucinich resolution may refer to the following legislative proposals by Dennis Kucinich (D), representative for Ohio's 10th congressional district:

- HR 333 for the Impeachment of Dick Cheney proposed in 2007
- A set of articles for the impeachment of U.S president George Walker Bush proposed in 2008
- HR 2990 a.k.a. the National Emergency Employment Defense Act (NEED Act), a monetary reform proposal submitted in 2011
