= Willford I. King =

- Born: June 2, 1880; Cascade, Iowa
- Died: October 17, 1962 (aged 82); Douglaston, New York

Academic background
- Education: University of Wisconsin–Madison; University of Nebraska

Willford Isbell King (June 2, 1880 – October 17, 1962) was an American statistician, economist, and chairman of the National Committee to Uphold Constitutional Government (NCUCG).

== Biography ==
King was born in Cascade, Iowa on June 2, 1880. King received his education from one-room schoolhouse teachers in Nebraska. He attended the University of Nebraska, graduating in 1905. He received his Doctor of Philosophy degree from University of Wisconsin–Madison in 1913.

He went to Washington, D.C. to become a statistician with the United States Public Health Service from 1917 to 1920. In 1917 he was elected as a Fellow of the American Statistical Association. In 1920, he moved on to become the economist for the National Bureau of Economic Research. In 1927, King moved on from public service to become an economics professor at New York University.

Working with Wesley Mitchell and others, King was an "NBER pioneer of income studies", precursor to GNP and GDP accounting and the System of National Accounts.

During the Great Depression, King opposed the New Deal. Instead, he advocated a sliding scale of wages based on production, no government intervention in business, currency expansion, the reduction of taxes in upper brackets, and the abolition of all levies on incomes of corporations and from invested capital.

In 1933, he founded the Committee on Economic Accord. In 1945, King retired from NYU to become chairman of the Committee for Constitutional Government, Inc., he later would serve as an advisor.

King and his wife Jane Elizabeth Patterson, had three children, Harold J., Hugh Patterson., and Floralie Jane.

KIng's grandson, and his namesake, is Willford S. King of Boise, Idaho. Willford is the son of Harold J. King.

King died at his home in Douglaston, New York on October 17, 1962.

== Works ==
- Economics in Rhyme (1928)
- The Handbook of Accepted Economics
- Keys to Prosperity
- The Elements of Statistical Method
- Income in the United States: Its Amount and Distribution, 1909–1919 (1921)
- The Wealth and Income of the People of the United States
- The National Income and Its Purchasing Power (1930)
- various articles on economics

== Pamphlets ==
- Are Food Subsidies Necessary? (ca. 1944)
- Are The Upper Income Classes Getting an Increasing Share of the National Income? (ca. 1944)

== See also ==
- A Program for Monetary Reform (1939)
