= Garfield V. Cox =

American economist

Garfield Vestal Cox (May 4, 1893 – February 9, 1970) was a leading authority on business fluctuations and forecasting. He was one of the first people to study the performance of experts versus novices in forecasting stock prices. He was also the Dean of the University of Chicago School of Business.

== Early life and education ==
Cox was born in Fairmount, Indiana to Quaker parents Milton T. and Martha E. Cox and grew up on their farm. He attended Earlham College for two years before transferring to Beloit College where he graduated in 1917. While at Beloit, he was a member of the Dew Drop Inn club. It was through the club that he met Warren C. Wade and his sister, Jeannette Wade, whom he eventually married. The club eventually became a chapter of Sigma Pi fraternity and Cox was initiated into the fraternity as an alumnus. In 1915, he attended a meeting in Indiana that led to the creation of the American Friends Service Committee.

Following his graduation, Cox was chosen to establish the Department of Public Speaking at Wabash College after his graduation.

When the United States entered World War I, Cox claimed an exemption from military service based on his Quaker beliefs. He did volunteer to go to the Western Front to serve as an aid worker for the American Friends Service Committee. He departed from New York City on September 1, 1918, and returned on August 25, 1919.

== Career ==
In 1920, Cox became an instructor of Finance at the University of Chicago (U.C.). He completed his Ph.D. at the university in 1929 and was promoted to professor in 1930.

In 1930, Cox was one of the first researchers to compare the performance of experts versus novices in forecasting stock prices. He found that expertise provided no advantage when compared to a minimal level of knowledge. There was even evidence that showed additional expertise may decrease accuracy.

Cox was also one of the authors of the 1933 Chicago plan which called for banking reforms at the start of the Great Depression. In 1935, Cox co-founded and became chairman of the board of South East National Bank of Chicago. He served on the board for twenty-four years.

He was named the Robert Law Professor of Finance in 1936. In 1942, he was named Acting Dean of the School of Finance, then Dean three years later.

In 1947, he was given the honorary Doctorate of Laws degree from Beloit College. He also received an honorary degree from Earlham College. In 1952, Cox stepped down from his position as Dean. He remained on the U.C. faculty until his retirement in 1958.

He was a lecturer at Chicago Theological Seminary. Cox served as president of the American Finance Association in 1954.

Cox retired from U.C. in 1958 and moved to California in 1959. While there, he taught at the Southern California School of Technology.

He was a contributor to the Encyclopedia of the Social Sciences, American Economic Review, Journal of Political Economy, Journal of the American Statistical Association, Journal of Business, and other scholarly periodicals. He also served as an economic consultant to business firms, appeared as an expert before several state public-service commissions, and was a noted speaker.

== Personal life ==
Before leaving for France during World War I, Cox married Jeannette Wade. They had three children, daughters Phyllis and Marilyn, and a son named Lowell.

Cox was a founder of the 57th Street Meeting of Friends in Chicago and served as its clerk for more than twenty years. He was a member of Phi Beta Kappa, Delta Sigma Rho, and Beta Gamma Sigma and was president of the University of Chicago Quadrangle Club and of the Chicago Chapter of the American Statistical Association.

He died in Los Angeles in 1970.

== Published works ==
Following are some of Cox's publications.

- Price Indexes in the United States – 1924
- Forecasting Business Conditions – 1927, 13 editions with Charles O. Hardy
- An Appraisal of American Business Forecasts – 1929, 9 editions
- The Relation of Stock Prices to Earnings – 1929
- Business Forecasting in the United States: 1918-1928 - 1929
- Inflation Burdens – 1935
- The Economic Meaning of the Townsend Plan – 1936, 4 editions with Carl H. Chatters and John H. Cover
- Is Socialism the Wave of the Future – 1946
- Private Business and the Public Good – 1970, 2 editions
