= Chicago Plan =

Collection of narrow banking reforms proposed for the US in 1935

The Chicago Plan was introduced by University of Chicago economists in 1933 as a comprehensive plan to reform the monetary and banking system of the United States. The Great Depression had been caused in part by excessive private bank lending, so the plan proposed to eliminate the private bank money creation method of fractional reserve lending. Centralized money creation would prevent booms and busts in the money supply. Multiple bills in the United States Congress are related to the Chicago Plan. Following the Great Recession, the plan was updated in a 2012 International Monetary Fund working paper.

== Background ==
=== Roaring Twenties ===
The Roaring Twenties, a period of economic growth in the United States, was marked by speculation and excessive lending. Under laissez-faire economic policies, loose lending practices fueled a bubble.

In this environment, stock market speculators used leverage to buy stocks on margin. Consumers had easy access to credit through installment plans and consumer loans, further fueling the growth of consumption and production.

Rapid economic expansion led to an oversupply of goods and services.

=== Great Depression ===
With the Wall Street crash of 1929, the Great Depression began. Federal Reserve Board monetary control was indirect since all twelve Federal Reserve banks could perform open market operations without Board consent. Banks with inadequate capital reserves found themselves unable to absorb potential losses from loan defaults or market fluctuations. Widespread bank runs culminated in a national banking holiday.

The Emergency Banking Act was enacted on March 9, 1933 to set reopening standards. Public demand for deposit insurance grew.

== Theoretical foundations ==
=== Endogenous vs. exogenous money creation ===
The Chicago Plan addressed a fundamental issue in monetary theory: whether money creation should be endogenous (driven by private sector credit demand) or exogenous (controlled by government authority). Under fractional reserve banking, money creation is endogenous—banks create money by making loans, and money supply changes based on credit demand and bank lending decisions.

The Chicago economists argued that endogenous money creation contributed to instability because it linked money supply to business cycles and speculative activities. During expansions, banks increased credit and money supply; during contractions, credit reduction decreased money supply. This procyclical behavior, they contended, made the monetary system a source of instability.

The Chicago Plan proposed making money creation exogenous by requiring 100% reserves on demand deposits. Only the government monetary authority would create new money, which would then be lent through equity-financed institutions. This would separate money creation from credit allocation, allowing each function to operate independently.

=== Separation of monetary and credit functions ===
The Chicago Plan was based on the premise that money creation and credit allocation serve different economic functions and should be separated. Proponents argued that money creation affects the entire economy through price levels, employment, and economic stability, while credit allocation should be determined by market forces based on risk assessment and return expectations.^{:7}

Supporters believed that combining these functions created systemic problems, as banks had incentives to create money (profitably through interest spread) but not necessarily to allocate credit efficiently.^{:21} During expansions, profitable lending opportunities encouraged money creation; during contractions, risk aversion led to credit contraction that reduced money supply.

The plan proposed that equity-financed investment trusts would handle credit allocation without money creation power.^{:6} These institutions would face market discipline because losses would affect shareholders directly, unlike banks where losses could potentially trigger systemic crises through deposit runs.^{:21}

=== Quantity theory and price level stability ===
The Chicago Plan reflected the quantity theory of money, which holds that price levels are determined by money supply relative to economic output. Supporters argued that under fractional reserves, money supply fluctuated with credit cycles, causing inflation during booms and deflation during busts, making long-term economic planning difficult.^{:53-4}

With 100% reserves, proponents argued, the government could maintain stable money supply growth aligned with economic output, potentially achieving price level stability. This would aim to eliminate monetary sources of business cycles while allowing markets to function in allocating resources.

== Proposal ==
=== Main provisions of the Chicago Plan ===
Its main provision was to require 100% reserves on deposits subject to check, so that "the creation and destruction of effective money through private lending operations would be impossible". The plan, in other words, envisaged to separate the issuing from the lending of money. This, according to its authors, would prevent the money supply from cyclically varying as bank loans were expanded or contracted. In addition, the payment system would become perfectly safe. No great monetary contraction as that of 1929–1933 could ever occur again.

=== Implementation mechanism ===
For the transition, the government would purchase bank assets equal to the difference between current reserves and required 100% reserves. Banks would surrender their fractional reserve privileges in exchange for government bonds or cash to meet the new requirements. Existing loans would be transferred to equity-financed investment trusts or gradually wound down.^{:6}

The monetary authority would then control money supply directly through its own lending or spending operations. New money creation would be based on economic considerations rather than bank profitability, potentially allowing for countercyclical monetary policy.

=== Key differences with other full-reserve plans ===
Other proponents of full reserves, however, such as Currie and Fisher, would still have allowed commercial banks to make loans out of savings deposits, as long as these could not be made transferable by check. As Fisher put it in 1936, the banks would be free to lend money, "provided we now no longer allow them to manufacture the money that they lend".

Although the Chicago Plan is often likened to other full-reserve plans (such as Fisher's), there were some important differences between them, for example, regarding bank intermediation. The Chicago Plan would not only have subjected checking deposits to full reserves, but further eliminated fractional-reserve banking itself: banks could no longer make loans out of savings deposits and would be replaced in their lending function by equity-financed investment trusts.

An important motivation of the Chicago Plan was to prevent the nationalization of the banking sector, which, in the context of the Great Depression, was considered by some as a real possibility. This concern was shared by Fisher: "In short: nationalize money, but do not nationalize banking."

== Economic analysis and debates ==
=== Theoretical advantages ===
Supporters argued the Chicago Plan would deliver several benefits. First, it would eliminate bank runs because deposits would be fully backed by reserves. Second, it would reduce monetary instability by removing the connection between credit cycles and money supply. Third, it would reduce both public and private debt by eliminating the need for government deposit insurance and reducing speculative lending.

The plan would also potentially improve monetary policy effectiveness by giving the central authority direct control over money supply. Rather than working through bank intermediaries who might not respond predictably to policy changes, the monetary authority could implement policy directly.

Economic modeling by 2012 IMF economists Jaromir Benes and Michael Kumhof suggested the plan could reduce economic volatility while maintaining economic growth. Their analysis indicated that eliminating boom-bust cycles in money creation would stabilize the overall economy.

=== Theoretical criticisms and limitations ===
Critics raised several fundamental objections. First, financial innovation might create new forms of "near money" outside narrow measures of money. Money market funds, commercial paper, and other innovations emerged to meet credit demand when traditional banking was restricted.

Second, the plan's emphasis on equity financing for all lending could create inefficiencies. Critics argued that debt financing serves important economic functions by allowing specialized risk assessment and enabling leverage for productive investments. Pure equity financing might reduce credit availability or increase its cost.

Third, the plan assumed that separating money creation from credit allocation would improve both functions. Critics argued that banks' local knowledge and relationship-based lending might be superior to centralized credit allocation, even if it came with monetary instability.

=== Practical implementation challenges ===
The transition to 100% reserves would face significant practical obstacles. The government would need to purchase large amounts of bank assets, potentially disruptive for banks. Protections for time and savings depositors could be reduced.

Financial markets would likely develop workarounds. Henry Simons himself recognized this problem, noting that 100% reserves would not be sufficient in a world where financial markets could innovate around legal restrictions.^{:18} Shadow banking, securitization, and other financial innovations have consistently demonstrated this tendency.

International coordination would be essential because mobile capital could circumvent national restrictions. Without global implementation, the plan might simply shift money creation to offshore or unregulated institutions.

=== Political economy obstacles ===
The plan faced consistent political opposition from the banking industry, which viewed it as threatening their business model. The American Bankers Association warned against "political control of banking" and mobilized against legislative proposals. Banks' political influence, combined with their economic importance, made comprehensive reform politically difficult.

The plan's complexity also hindered political support. Unlike simple reforms like deposit insurance, the Chicago Plan required extensive public education about monetary theory. Politicians found it easier to support measures that addressed visible symptoms (bank runs) rather than underlying structural issues.

Economic recovery during World War II reduced pressure for fundamental reform. The success of deposit insurance in preventing bank runs eliminated the most visible problem the Chicago Plan addressed, reducing political momentum for more comprehensive changes.

== History ==
=== Origins (1933) ===
Frederick Soddy proposed 100% reserves for transaction deposits in his 1926 book. Frank Knight, a laissez-faire proponent at the University of Chicago, wrote in his review

"The practical thesis of the book is distinctly unorthodox, but is in our opinion both highly significant and theoretically correct. In the abstract, it is absurd and monstrous for society to pay the commercial banking system “interest” for multiplying several fold the quantity of medium of exchange when (a) a public agency could do it at negligible cost, (b) there is no sense in having it done at all, since the effect is simply to raise the price level, and (c) important evils result, notably the frightful instability of the whole economic system and its periodical collapse in crises, which are in large measure bound up with the variability and uncertainty of the credit structure if not directly the effect of it."

The Chicago Plan was suggested by University of Chicago economists including Henry Simons, Garfield Cox, Aaron Director, Paul Douglas, Albert G. Hart, Frank Knight, Lloyd Mints and Henry Schultz.

A six-page memorandum on banking reform was given limited and confidential distribution to about forty individuals on 16 March 1933. The plan was supported by such notable economists as Frank H. Knight, Paul H. Douglas, and Henry C. Simons, as well as by Lloyd Mints, Henry Schultz, Garfield V. Cox, Aaron Director, and Albert G. Hart.

Between March and November 1933, the Chicago economists received comments from a number of individuals on their proposal, and in November 1933, another memorandum was prepared. The memorandum was expanded to thirteen pages; there was a supplementary memorandum on "Long-time Objectives of Monetary Management" (seven pages) and an appendix titled "Banking and Business Cycles" (six pages).

These memoranda generated much interest and discussion among lawmakers. However, the suggested reforms, such as the imposition of full reserves on demand deposits, were shelved and replaced by less drastic measures. The Banking Act of 1935 institutionalized federal deposit insurance and the separation of commercial and investment banking. It successfully restored the public's confidence in the banking system and ended discussion of banking reform.

=== Reception ===
The Chicago Plan was presented to President Franklin D. Roosevelt (FDR) by Henry A. Wallace within a week. FDR asked Congress for legislation in 1934 to establish a sound and adequate currency system.

This idea of full reserves on checking deposits would be advocated by other economists in the 1930s, including Lauchlin Currie of Harvard and Irving Fisher of Yale. A more recent variant of this reform idea is to be found in the "narrow banking" proposal.

The American Bankers Association (ABA) warned against "political control of banking" and feared more radical change.

== Legislative efforts ==
Congress passed the Banking Act of 1933 on June 16, 1933, creating the Federal Deposit Insurance Corporation (FDIC) and separating commercial and investment banking through the Glass-Steagall Act.

=== Alternative proposals ===
In 1934, Thomas Alan Goldsborough sponsored bills HR 7157/8780 to create a Federal Monetary Authority with sole right to issue legal tender. Lauchlin Currie proposed a plan essentially identical to the Chicago Plan except for its allowance of branch banking that gained support from Treasury advisors as well as experts supporting significant monetary system changes.

=== 1935 bill ===
Senator Bronson M. Cutting sponsored S 3744 based on an outline of the Chicago Plan. Rep. Wright Patman introduced a companion bill H.R. 9855. Unfortunately Cutting died on May 6, 1935.

In July 1935, Senator Gerald Nye proposed a substitute bill that incorporated elements of the Chicago Plan, including 100% reserves and a central monetary authority.

The Banking Act of 1935 passed on August 19, 1935. It did not include 100% reserves. Jacob Viner and other economists and politicians believed that this was a first step in reform.

=== A Program for Monetary Reform (1939) ===
As America entered the Recession of 1937–1938, this caused renewed discussion of the key elements of the Chicago Plan, and in July 1939 a new proposal was drafted, titled A Program for Monetary Reform. The draft paper was attributed on its cover page to six American economists: Paul H. Douglas, Irving Fisher, Frank D. Graham, Earl J. Hamilton, Willford I. King, and Charles R. Whittlesey. It claimed that 235 economists from 157 universities and colleges had expressed approval of the draft with 40 more had "approved it with reservations" and "43 have expressed disapproval".

The proposal was never published. A copy of the paper is in the Yale University Library. Copies of the paper, stamped on the bottom of the first and last pages "LIBRARY – COLORADO STATE COLLEGE OF A. & M. A. – FORT COLLINS COLORADO" were circulated at the 5th Annual American Monetary Institute Monetary Reform Conference (2009), and the images were scanned for display on the internet.

The Chicago Plan was submitted to the Government, but did not become law.

=== Monetary Stabilization and Debt Reduction Act of 1945 ===
Following the Recession of 1937–1938, Jerry Voorhis made the case for 100% reserves. In 1941, the US economy heated up with WWII. In 1945, Voorhis sponsored HR 3648 to establish a Monetary Authority. Jerry Voorhis was defeated in 1946 by Richard Nixon.

=== NEED Act ===
A variation of the Chicago Plan's 100% reserve proposal was the NEED Act sponsored by Dennis Kucinich in 2011.

=== IMF's Chicago Plan revisited (2012) ===
In August 2012, the proposal was given renewed attention after the International Monetary Fund (IMF) published a working paper by Jaromir Benes and Michael Kumhof. In the paper, the authors have updated the original Chicago Plan proposal to fit into today's economy. They conclude that the advantages of such a system, according to the authors, are a more balanced economy without the booms and busts of the current system, the elimination of bank runs, and a drastic reduction of both public and private debt. The authors rely on economic theory and historical examples and state that inflation, according to their calculations, would be very low.

=== 2015 proposals ===
Iceland commissioned a study on the 2008 financial crisis. Frosti Sigurjónsson referenced the Chicago Plan in his 2015 sovereign money proposal.

In the Netherlands, Ons Geld gathered over 100,000 signatures in a 2015 citizens initiative, leading to a parliamentary debate and monetary system study.

=== 2018 Swiss sovereign-money initiative ===
Advocates for the 2018 Swiss sovereign-money initiative looked to Irving Fisher and the Chicago Plan as the first version of Vollgeld. The initiative was defeated, with over 75% per cent voting No.

== Criticisms ==
Asked about the paper in 2019, Christine Lagarde (managing director of the IMF when the paper was published) said that she was not convinced "that eliminating the role of private banks in the supply of 'broad' money is a good idea".

== See also ==
- Islamic banking and finance
- Full-reserve banking
- Money creation
- NEED Act
- Technocracy movement

== Bibliography ==
- Douglas, Paul H.; Hamilton, Earl J.; Fisher, Irving; King, Willford I.; Graham, Frank D.; Whittlesey, Charles R. (July 1939), A Program for Monetary Reform (original scanned PDF), (transcript text here), archived from the original (PDF) on 26 July 2011
