= John Hotson =

Canadian economist

John Hotson (1930 - 1996) was a Canadian economist at the University of Waterloo and co-founder of Committee on Monetary and Economic Reform.

== Academic career ==
Hotson graduated from Colorado College in 1952.

He was the chair of the economics department at the University of Waterloo. He was an editor of the Journal of Post Keynesian Economics.

Hotson co-founded the Committee on Monetary and Economic Reform in 1988.

Hotson also founded Results Canada.

== Personal life ==
Hotson retired in 1993. He was involved with The Hunger Project. He died on January 21, 1996.

== Books ==
- International Comparisons of Money Velocity and Wage Markups (1968)
- Stagflation and the Bastard Keynesians (1976)
