= Jackie Kucinich =

American reporter (born 1981)

- Born: Jacqueline Faith Kucinich; December 4, 1981 (age 44); Columbus, Ohio, U.S.
- Education: American University
- Occupation: Journalist
- Years active: 2005–present
- Spouse: Jared Allen (m. 2011)
- Parent(s): Dennis Kucinich (father); Sandra Lee McCarthy (mother)

Jacqueline Faith Kucinich (born December 4, 1981) is an American reporter. She is the Washington, D.C. bureau chief for The Boston Globe. Previously, she was the Washington bureau chief for The Daily Beast. Since the 2016 presidential election, she has been a CNN commentator. She is the daughter of Dennis Kucinich, former mayor of Cleveland, Democratic congressman and two-time presidential candidate. She is also the niece of Gary Kucinich, former Cleveland City Councilman.

== Early life and education ==
Kucinich was born in Columbus, Ohio, to Dennis Kucinich and Sandra Lee McCarthy. Her father was formerly the mayor of Cleveland and Democratic congressman from Ohio's 10th congressional district. Her father is of Croat and Irish ancestry. Her mother was an English and broadcast journalism teacher. Her parents divorced in 1986. Her godmother is actress Shirley MacLaine.

Kucinich graduated from American University in Washington, D.C.

== Career ==
Beginning in 2005, Kucinich became a reporter covering Congress for political newspaper The Hill. Shortly thereafter, Kucinich was hired as a reporter for Roll Call, starting in 2008.

In 2011, Kucinich joined USA Today covering politics, and the 2012 presidential elections. She has been a frequent guest commentator on CNN and MSNBC and has appeared on Fox News and C-SPAN.

In April 2013, she landed at The Washington Post, covering politics. She was co-anchor on the company's new Web channel.

In early 2015, Kucinich joined The Daily Beast.

== Personal life ==
In October 2011, Kucinich married Jared Louis Allen, who works in public relations, in Washington, D.C.
