= American Monetary Institute =

The American Monetary Institute is a non-profit charitable trust established by Stephen Zarlenga in 1996 for the "independent study of monetary history, theory and reform."

== Aims ==
The institute is dedicated to monetary reform and advocates taking control of the monetary system out of the hands of banks and placing it into the hands of the US Treasury. Zarlenga argues that this would mean money would be issued by government interest free and spent into circulation to promote the general welfare, and that substantial expenditures on infrastructure, including human infrastructure (education and health care) would become the predominant method of putting new money into circulation.

To finally correct the money-creation ceded to private banks by Congress in 1913 through the creation of the Federal Reserve system, Congress could enact the Monetary Reform Act long proposed and vetted by seasoned market veterans of the American Monetary Institute.

== See also ==
- Committee on Monetary and Economic Reform (Canada)
- Chartalism
- Monetary reform
- Money creation
- Chicago plan
