= Lloyd Mints =

American economist

Lloyd Wynn Mints
- Born: February 20, 1888; Brookings, South Dakota
- Died: January 3, 1989 (aged 100)

Academic work
- Discipline: Economics
- School or tradition: Chicago School of Economics

Lloyd Wynn Mints (1888–1989) was an American economist, notable for his contributions to the quantity theory of money.

== Biography ==
Born in South Dakota, Lloyd Mints moved with his family in 1888 to Missouri and then in 1901 to Boulder, Colorado. He received from the University of Colorado Boulder his bachelor's degree in 1914 and master's degree in 1915. He was a secondary school teacher in Cripple Creek, Colorado from 1915 to 1917 and then moved to Washington, D.C. as an analyst in a federal office. In 1918 he was transferred to Chicago. In 1919 Mints enrolled as a graduate student at the University of Chicago, where he was assigned to teach undergraduate courses. He completed several graduate courses in economics and was promoted to assistant professor of political economy in 1923. He taught introductory economics courses until 1928 when he was put in charge of teaching money and banking courses. He retired as professor emeritus in 1953.

The trio of Mints, Simons and Knight form the core of what many refer to as the 'Chicago School' of the 1930s and early 1940s. ... Mints provided a reformulation of the quantity theory which could stand against both the mainstream of the American economists over the first three decades of the twentieth century and the emerging Keynesianism of the late 1930s and 1940s.

Mints was an advocate of the view that the Federal Reserve System should have increased the quantity of money during the years from 1929 to 1933. Mints was also a main critic of the real bills doctrine in the 20th century.

Mints had a strong influence on development of Chicago monetary economics, in particular on Milton Friedman's thinking.

== Selected publications ==
=== Articles ===
- Mints, Lloyd, "The Elasticity of Banknotes," Journal of Political Economy, 38, August 1920, pages 458–71.
- Mints, Lloyd, "Open Market Borrowing to Finance the Production of Goods Sold for Future Delivery," Journal of Political Economy, 31, February 1923, pages 128–38.
- Mints, Lloyd, "Expansion of Fixed and Working Capital by Open Market Borrowing," Journal of Political Economy, 31, April 1923, pages 299–302.
- Mints, Lloyd, "Monetary Policy," Review of Economics and Statistics, 28, May 1946, pages 60–69.
- Mints, Lloyd, "Monetary Policy and Stabilization," American Economic Review (Supplement), 41, May 1951, pages 188–193.
- Mints, Lloyd and others, "Monetary Policy: Discussion," American Economic Review (Supplement), 43, May 1953, pages 54–60.

=== Books ===
- Lloyd Wynn Mints (1945). A History of Banking Theory in Great Britain and the United States. University of Chicago Press. ISBN 9780226530475. OCLC 249858.
- Lloyd Wynn Mints (1950). Monetary Policy for a Competitive Society. McGraw-Hill. OCLC 610788.
