= Dennis Kucinich =

American politician (born 1946)

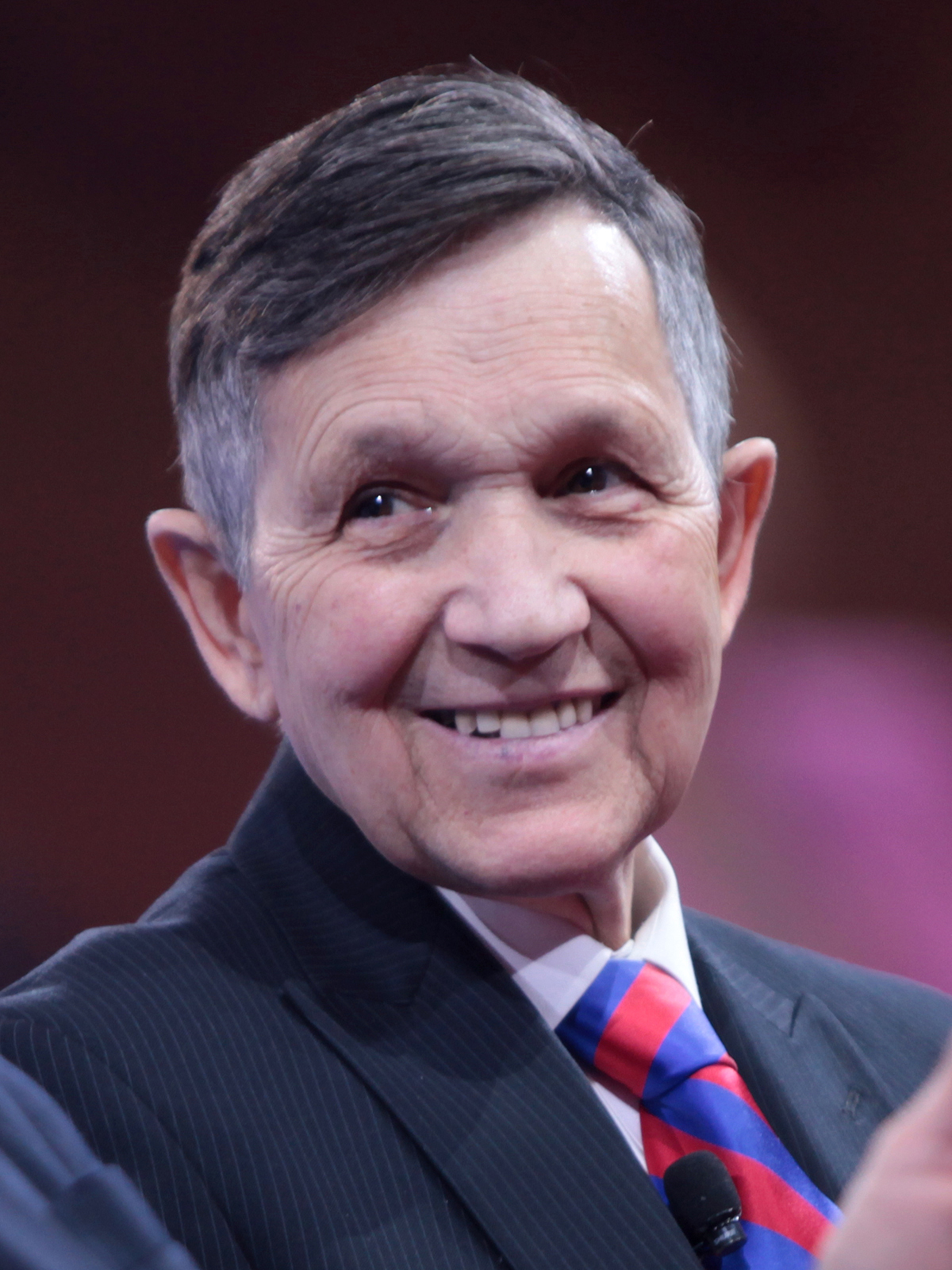
- Kucinich in 2015

Member of the U.S. House of Representatives from Ohio's 10th district
- In office January 3, 1997 – January 3, 2013
- Preceded by: Martin Hoke
- Succeeded by: Marcy Kaptur (redistricted)

Member of the Ohio Senate from the 23rd district
- In office January 3, 1995 – January 2, 1997
- Preceded by: Anthony Sinagra
- Succeeded by: Patrick Sweeney

53rd Mayor of Cleveland
- In office November 14, 1977 – November 6, 1979
- Preceded by: Ralph Perk
- Succeeded by: George Voinovich

Member of the Cleveland City Council from Ward 12
- In office August 9, 1983 – December 31, 1985
- In office January 1, 1970 – December 31, 1973

Personal details
- Born: Dennis John Kucinich; October 8, 1946 (age 80) Cleveland, Ohio, U.S.
- Party: Democratic (until 2024); Independent (2024–present)
- Spouse(s): Helen Kucinich (divorced) Sandra Lee McCarthy (m. 1977; div. 1986) Elizabeth Harper (m. 2005)
- Children: Jackie
- Education: Cleveland State University; Case Western Reserve University (BA, MA)
- Website: Official website
- Kucinich's voice Kucinich on the Bush administration's foreign policy. Recorded July 30, 2007

Dennis John Kucinich (/kuːˈsɪnɪtʃ/ koo-SIN-itch; October 8, 1946) is an American politician. Originally a Democrat, Kucinich served as U.S. representative from Ohio's 10th congressional district from 1997 to 2013. From 1977 to 1979, he served a term as mayor of Cleveland, where he narrowly survived a recall election and successfully fought an effort to sell the municipal electric utility before losing his reelection contest to George Voinovich.

Considered one of the most politically liberal members of Congress during his tenure, Kucinich unsuccessfully ran for president in the 2004 and 2008 Democratic primaries. During his 2004 presidential campaign, he ran as a staunch opponent of the Iraq War, garnering him support among some anti-war activists. Despite not winning a single primary contest, Kucinich was the last opponent of eventual nominee John Kerry to drop out.

As a 2008 presidential candidate, Kucinich ran in support of single-payer health care, the impeachment of then-Vice President Dick Cheney, and the establishment of a "Department of Peace". He dropped out early during the 2008 primary contest after faring poorly in early states. During his final two terms in Congress, Kucinich at times criticized then-President Barack Obama, and argued in favor of Obama's impeachment following the 2011 military intervention in Libya.

As a result of redistricting following the 2010 census, redrawn congressional boundaries forced Kucinich to face Representative Marcy Kaptur in the newly-drawn 9th district. Kaptur defeated Kucinich in the Democratic primary, and Kucinich left office in 2013. In January 2013, he became a contributor on the Fox News Channel appearing on programs such as The O'Reilly Factor. He ran for governor of Ohio in the 2018 election, losing in the primary to Richard Cordray. Kucinich was also an unsuccessful primary candidate in the 2021 Cleveland mayoral election. He ran for Ohio's 7th congressional district as an independent in 2024 and finished third, garnering 13% of the vote.

== Early life and education ==
Kucinich was born in Cleveland's West Side Tremont neighborhood, the oldest of the seven children of Virginia (née Norris) and Frank J. Kucinich. His father, who was of Croat ancestry, worked as a truck driver and was a member of the Teamsters for 35 years; his Irish American mother was a homemaker. Growing up, his family moved 21 times and Dennis was often charged with the responsibility of finding apartments they could afford.

Kucinich graduated from St. John Cantius High School in 1965. He attended Cleveland State University from 1967 to 1970. In 1973, he graduated from Case Western Reserve University with both a Bachelor and a Master of Arts degree in speech and communication.

== Early political career ==
Kucinich's political career began in 1967 when he ran unsuccessfully for office. In 1969, he was elected to the Cleveland City Council at the age of 23. In 1972, Kucinich ran for the U.S. House of Representatives, losing narrowly to incumbent Republican William E. Minshall Jr. After Minshall's retirement in 1974, Kucinich sought the seat again, this time failing to get the Democratic nomination, which went to Ronald M. Mottl. Kucinich ran as an independent candidate in the general election, placing third with about 30% of the vote. In 1975, Kucinich became clerk of the municipal court in Cleveland and served in that position for two years.

== Mayoralty (1977–1979) ==
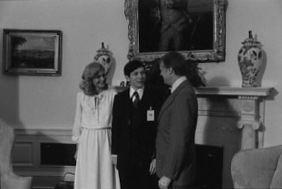
Kucinich with President Jimmy Carter in 1978

Kucinich was elected mayor of Cleveland in 1977 and served in that position until 1979. At age 31, he was the youngest mayor of a major city in the United States, earning him the nickname "the boy mayor of Cleveland". Kucinich's tenure as mayor is often regarded as one of the most tumultuous in Cleveland's history.

After Kucinich refused to sell Municipal Light (now Cleveland Public Power), Cleveland's publicly owned electric utility, the Cleveland mafia sought to murder him in a contract killing. A hit man from Maryland planned to shoot him in the head during the Columbus Day Parade, but the plot fell apart when Kucinich was hospitalized with a bleeding ulcer and missed the event. When the city fell into default shortly thereafter, the Mafia leaders called off the contract killer.

In 1984, John F. Sopko, then assistant counsel to the Minority Subcommittee staff, testified to the Senate Permanent Subcommittee on Investigations, "Intelligence information gleaned by the Maryland State Police and Cleveland Police Department confirmed that the murder contract was, in general terms, due to the fact that Kucinich had caused considerable problems for local dishonest businessmen, politicians and criminals." Sopko said, "It was alleged that Kucinich had been impeding organized criminal activities and its ability to make money in the city. As a result, someone decided to do away with the mayor."

The Cleveland Trust Company suddenly required all the city's debts be paid in full, forcing the city into default, after news of Kucinich's refusal to sell the city utility. For years, these debts were routinely rolled over, pending future payment, until Kucinich's announcement was made public. In 1998, the Cleveland City Council honored him for having had the "courage and foresight" to stand up to the banks, which saved the city an estimated $195 million between 1985 and 1995.

=== Post-mayoralty ===
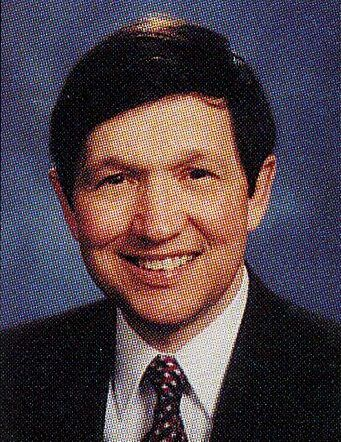
Kucinich as a State Senator

After losing his reelection bid for mayor to George Voinovich in 1979, Kucinich initially kept a low profile in Cleveland politics. He criticized a tax referendum Voinovich proposed in 1980, which voters eventually approved. He also struggled to find employment and moved to Los Angeles, where he stayed with a friend, actress Shirley MacLaine. For the next three years, Kucinich worked as a radio talk-show host, lecturer, and consultant. It was a difficult period for him financially. Without a steady paycheck, Kucinich fell behind in his mortgage payments, nearly lost his house in Cleveland, and borrowed money from friends, including MacLaine, to keep it. On his 1982 income tax return, Kucinich reported an income of $38. Of this period, Kucinich has said, "When I was growing up in Cleveland, my early experience conditioned me to hang in there and not to quit... It's one thing to experience that as a child, but when you have to as an adult, it has a way to remind you how difficult things can be. You understand what people go through."

In 1982, Kucinich moved back to Cleveland and ran for Secretary of State; he lost the Democratic primary to Sherrod Brown. In 1983, Kucinich won a special election to fill the seat of a Cleveland city councilman who had died. His brother, Gary Kucinich, was also a councilman at the time.

In 1985, there was some speculation that Kucinich might run for mayor again. Instead, his brother Gary ran against (and lost to) the incumbent Voinovich. Kucinich, meanwhile, gave up his council position to run for governor of Ohio as an independent against Richard Celeste, but later withdrew from the race. After this, Kucinich, in his own words "on a quest for meaning," lived quietly in New Mexico until 1994, when he won a seat in the Ohio State Senate.

== United States Representative (1997–2013) ==
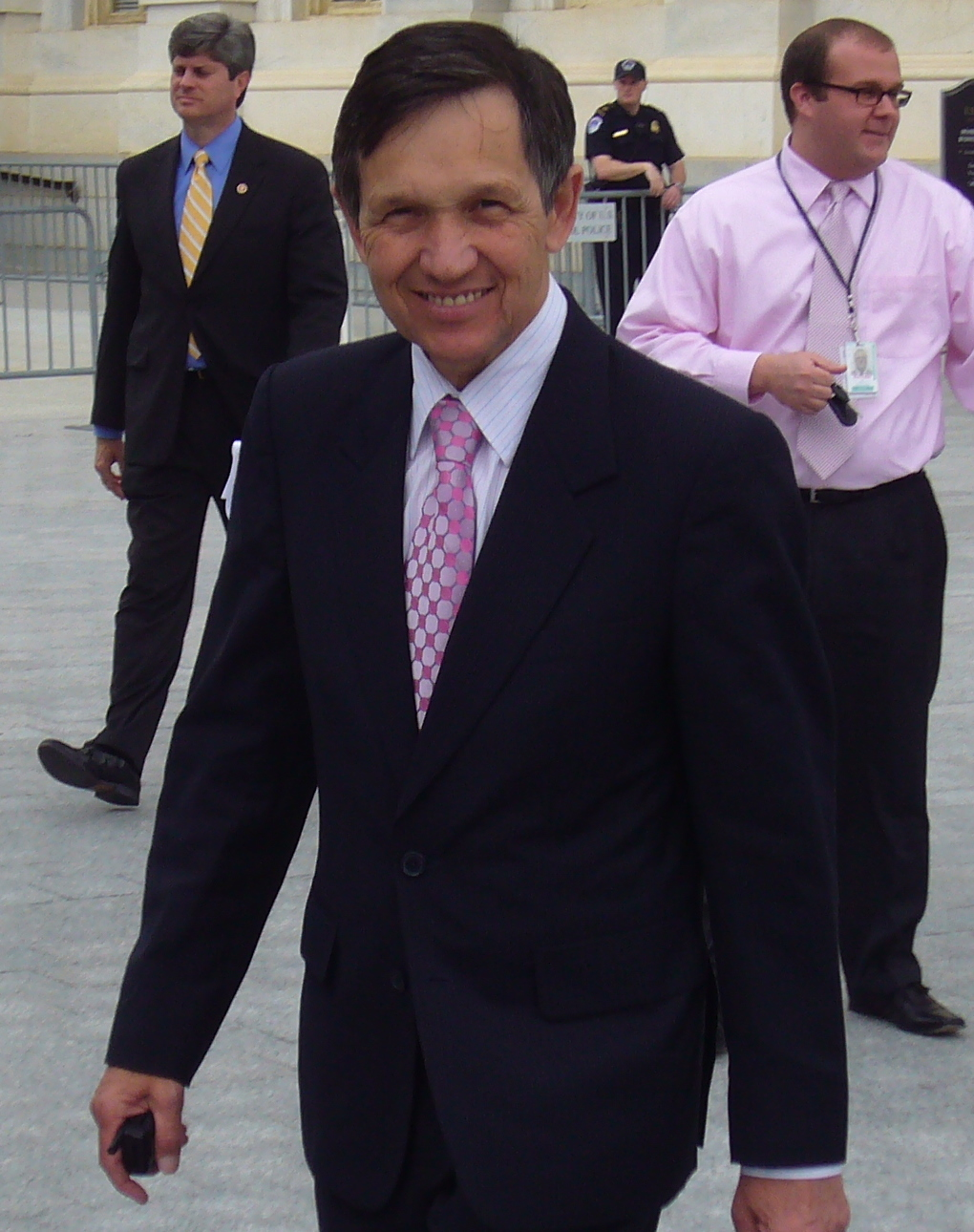
Kucinich outside the Capitol in June 2007

In 1996, Kucinich was elected to represent Ohio's 10th district in the U.S. House of Representatives, defeating two-term Republican incumbent Martin Hoke by three percentage points. He never faced another general election contest that close and was reelected seven times.

=== Committee assignments ===
- Committee on Education and the Workforce
  - Subcommittee on Workforce Protections
  - Subcommittee on Health, Employment, Labor, and Pensions
- Committee on Oversight and Government Reform
  - Subcommittee on Regulatory Affairs, Stimulus Oversight and Government Spending (Ranking Member)

Kucinich served as chair of the Congressional Progressive Caucus from 1999 to 2003, after founding chair Bernie Sanders, and was succeeded by Peter DeFazio.

Kucinich was one of the 31 House Democrats who voted to not count the 20 electoral votes from Ohio in the 2004 presidential election, despite Republican president George Bush winning the state by 118,457 votes.

=== Domestic policy voting record ===
In 2008, Kucinich introduced articles of impeachment in the House of Representatives against President George W. Bush for the invasion and occupation of Iraq.

Although his voting record was not always in line with that of the Democratic Party, on March 17, 2010, after being courted by President Barack Obama, his wife and others, Kucinich reluctantly agreed to vote with his colleagues for the Affordable Care Act, even without a public option component.

Kucinich criticized the flag-burning amendment and voted against the impeachment of President Bill Clinton. His congressional voting record was strongly anti-abortion, although he has noted that he never supported a constitutional amendment prohibiting abortion altogether. In 2003, however, he began describing himself as pro-abortion rights and said he had shifted away from his earlier position. Press releases indicated that he supported abortion rights, ending abstinence-only sex education and increasing the use of contraception to make abortion "less necessary" over time. His voting record since 2003 received mixed ratings from abortion rights groups.

== Presidential campaigns ==
=== 2004 ===
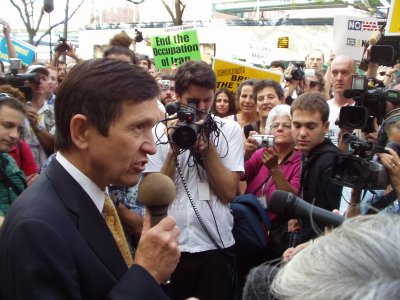
Kucinich speaks out against the occupation of Iraq at the 2004 Democratic National Convention.

Kucinich was criticized during his 2004 campaign for changing his stance on the issue of abortion. His explanation was, "I've always worked to make abortions less necessary, through sex education and birth control. But the direction that Congress has taken, increasingly, is to make it impossible for women to be able to have an abortion if they need to protect their health. So when I saw the direction taken, it finally came to the point where I understood that women will not be truly free unless they have the right to choose."

On December 10, 2003, the American Broadcasting Company (ABC) announced the removal of its correspondents from the campaigns of Kucinich, Carol Moseley Braun and Al Sharpton. Previously critical of the limited coverage given his campaign, Kucinich characterized ABC's decision as an example of media companies' power to shape campaigns by choosing which candidates to cover and questioned its timing, coming immediately after the debate. ABC News, while stating its commitment to give coverage to a wide range of candidates, argued that focusing more of its "finite resources" on the candidates most likely to win would best serve the public.

In the 2004 Democratic presidential nomination race, national polls consistently showed Kucinich's support in single digits. In the Iowa caucuses, he finished fifth, receiving about 1% of the state delegates, far below the 15% threshold for receiving national delegates. He performed similarly in the New Hampshire primary, placing sixth among the seven candidates with 1% of the vote. In the Mini-Tuesday primaries, he finished near the bottom in most states. His best performance was in New Mexico, where he received over 5% of the vote but still no delegates. Kucinich's best showing in any Democratic contest was in the February 24 Hawaii caucus, in which he won 31% of caucus participants, finishing second behind Senator John Kerry. He also had a double-digit showing in Maine on February 8, receiving 16% in the state's caucus. On Super Tuesday, March 2, Kucinich had another strong showing in the Minnesota caucus, receiving 17% of the vote. In Ohio, he received 9%. Kucinich campaigned heavily in Oregon, spending 30 days there during the two months leading up to the state's May 18 primary. He continued his campaign because "the future direction of the Democratic Party has not yet been determined" and chose to focus on Oregon "because of its progressive tradition and its pioneering spirit." He won 16% of the vote.

Even after Kerry won enough delegates to secure the nomination, Kucinich continued to campaign until just before the convention, citing an effort to help shape the agenda of the Democratic Party. He was the last candidate to end his campaign. He endorsed Kerry on July 22, four days before the start of the Democratic National Convention.

=== 2008 ===
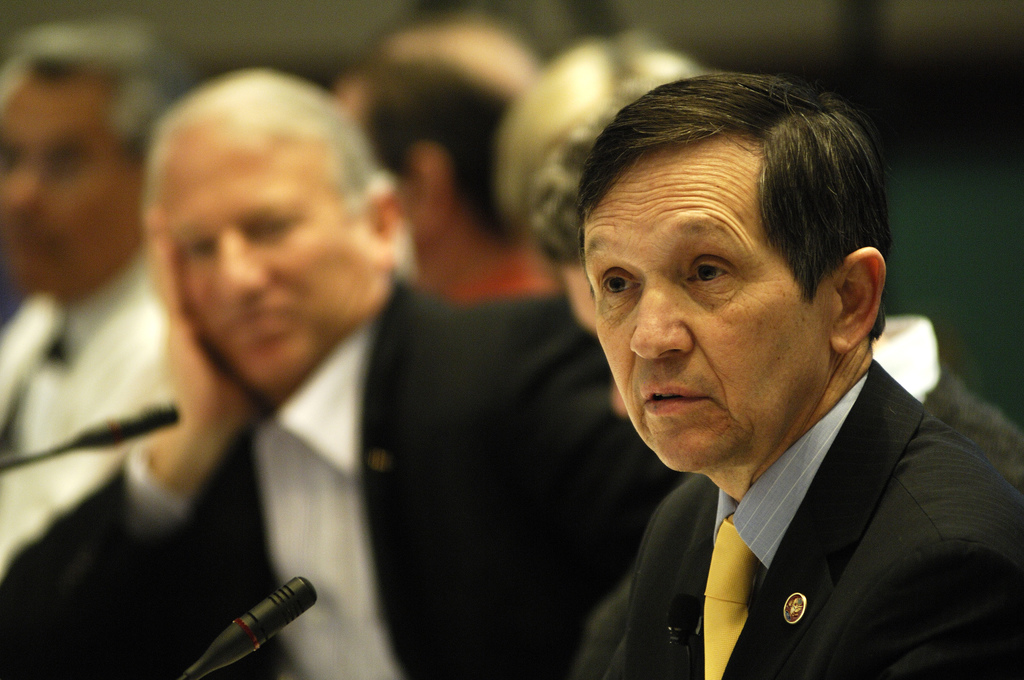
Kucinich speaking on the campaign trail, January 2007.

On December 11, 2006, in a speech at Cleveland City Hall, Kucinich announced he would seek the Democratic nomination for president in 2008.

Kucinich told his supporters in Iowa that if he did not appear on the second ballot in a caucus that they should back Barack Obama.

At an October 2007 debate, NBC's Tim Russert cited a passage from a book by Shirley MacLaine in which she writes that Kucinich had seen a UFO. Asked if it was true, Kucinich confirmed it. In November 2007, Larry Flynt hosted a fundraiser for Kucinich that drew criticism from Flynt's detractors. Campaign representatives declined to comment. Kucinich was endorsed by author Gore Vidal and actor Viggo Mortensen. In January 2008, he asked for a New Hampshire recount based on alleged discrepancies between the machine-counted ballots and the hand-counted ballots. He stated that he wanted to make sure "100% of the voters had 100% of their votes counted."

In January 2008, Kucinich was excluded from a Democratic presidential debate on MSNBC due to his poor showing in the Iowa and New Hampshire primaries. A ruling that the debate could not go ahead without him was overturned on appeal. Later that month, Kucinich dropped out of the race and did not endorse any other candidate. He endorsed Barack Obama after Obama won the nomination.

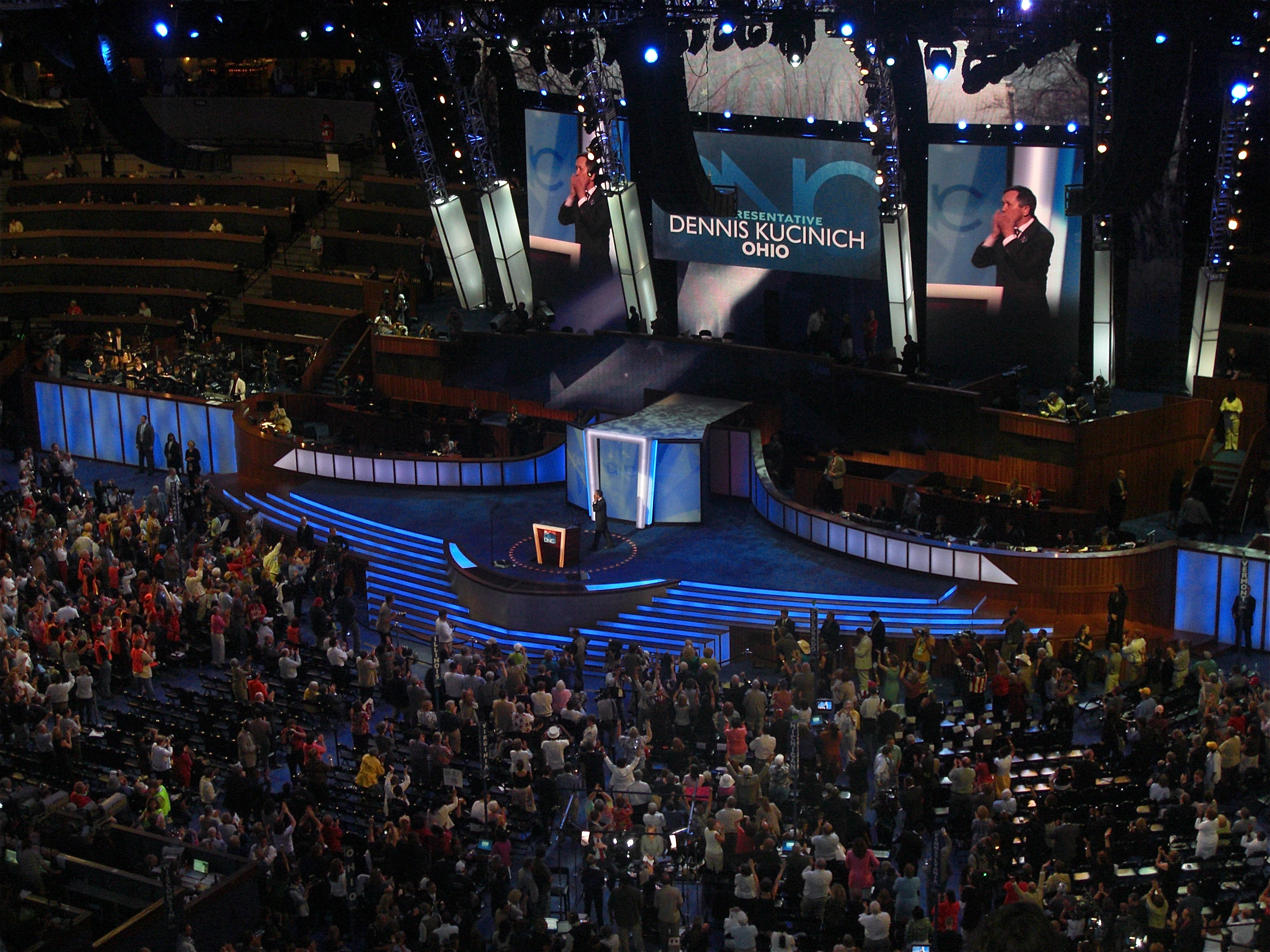
Kucinich gestures to the audience during his speech on the second day of the 2008 Democratic National Convention in Denver, Colorado.

On August 27, 2008, he delivered a speech at the Democratic National Convention.

== Congressional campaigns ==
Until 2012, Kucinich was reelected to Congress by big margins in his strongly Democratic-leaning districts.

=== 2006 ===
Kucinich defeated a Democratic primary challenger by a wide margin and defeated Republican Mike Dovilla in the general election with 66% of the vote.

=== 2008 United States House of Representatives election in Ohio's 10th District ===
His opponents included Cleveland City Councilman Joe Cimperman and North Olmsted Mayor Thomas O'Grady. In February 2008, Kucinich raised around $50,000 compared to Cimperman's $228,000, but through a YouTube fund-raising campaign he managed to raise $700,000, surpassing Cimperman's $487,000.

Cimperman, who was endorsed by the mayor of Cleveland and The Plain Dealer, criticized Kucinich for focusing too much on campaigning for president and not on the district. Kucinich accused Cimperman of representing corporate and real estate interests. Cimperman described Kucinich as an absentee congressman who failed to pass any major legislative initiatives in his 12-year House career. In an interview, Cimperman said he was tired of Kucinich and Cleveland being joke fodder for late-night talk-show hosts, saying: "It's time for him to go home." A Cimperman campaign ad stated that Kucinich had missed over 300 votes, but the actual number was 139. It was also suggested that Kucinich's calls for universal health care and an immediate withdrawal from Iraq made him a thorn in the side of the Democrats' congressional leadership, as well as his refusal to pledge to support the eventual presidential nominee, which he later reconsidered.

Kucinich took part in a debate with the other primary challengers. Barbara Ferris criticized him for not bringing as much money back to the district as other area legislators and authoring just one bill that passed during his 12 years in Congress. Kucinich responded: "It was a Republican Congress and there weren't many Democrats passing meaningful legislation during a Republican Congress." He won the primary with 68,156 votes out of 135,589 cast, beating Cimperman 52% to 33%.

Kucinich defeated former state representative Jim Trakas in the November 4 general election with 157,268 votes, 57.02% of those cast. Trakas received 107,918 votes (39.13%).

=== 2010 United States House of Representatives election in Ohio's 10th District ===
Kucinich defeated Republican nominee Peter J. Corrigan and Libertarian nominee Jeff Goggins in the November 2 general election with 101,343 votes, 53.1% of those cast.

=== 2012 United States House of Representatives election in Ohio's 9th District ===
Redistricting after the 2010 census eliminated Kucinich's district. The new map shifted the bulk of Kucinich's territory, including his home, to the Toledo-based 9th District, represented since 1983 by fellow Democrat Marcy Kaptur. Kucinich had been endorsed by another House member, Barney Frank of Massachusetts. The two competed in the Democratic primary on March 6, with Graham Veysey, a small-business owner from Cleveland, also on the ballot. Kaptur won the primary with 56% of the vote to Kucinich's 40%. The redrawn district contained roughly 60% of Kaptur's former territory.

In the general election, with 73% of the vote, Kaptur won a 16th term against Republican Samuel "Joe the Plumber" Wurzelbacher and Libertarian Sean Stipe.

Kucinich was often mentioned as a possible 2012 candidate for Congress in Washington's newly created 10th district, but decided to retire from Congress when his term ended in January 2013.

== Later political ventures ==
=== 2018 gubernatorial campaign ===
In January 2018, Kucinich announced his candidacy for governor of Ohio in the 2018 election. He was criticized for working as a Fox News contributor. Tara Samples, an Akron city councilwoman, was his running mate. Our Revolution, a grassroots progressive organization founded by Bernie Sanders, endorsed Kucinich, but Sanders did not. Kucinich lost the primary to Richard Cordray, 62.3% to 22.9%.

=== 2021 Cleveland mayor campaign ===
In December 2020, Kucinich announced his candidacy for mayor of Cleveland in the 2021 election. Though seen as likely to qualify in the seven-way nonpartisan primary for the two runoff spots, Kucinich finished in third place with 16.54%.

=== 2024 Robert F. Kennedy Jr. presidential campaign manager ===
In May 2023, Robert F. Kennedy Jr.'s 2024 presidential campaign announced that Kucinich had been selected as its campaign manager. He served until October 2023, shortly after Kennedy switched from a Democrat to an independent.

=== 2024 campaign to represent Ohio's 7th congressional district ===
In 2024, Kucinich announced his campaign to represent Ohio's 7th congressional district as an independent. The 7th included much of the territory he had represented in Congress. He placed third with 13% of the vote, losing to incumbent Republican Max Miller. This was the best result for an independent candidate running for Congress in Ohio since Jim Traficant received 16% of the vote in 2010.

== Television pundit ==
In January 2013, Kucinich joined Fox News Channel as a regular contributor. He appeared on The O'Reilly Factor and other Fox News shows. Kucinich quit Fox News in January 2018 as he announced plans to run for governor. Since running for governor, Kucinich has reappeared on the network, in 2019 discussing Democratic primary debates, and appeared on Larry King's PoliticKING program, speaking against the Democrats' push to impeach President Trump.

== Political positions ==
After being elected to Congress in 1996, Kucinich began to position himself on the left. Based on his voting record in Congress, the American Conservative Union (ACU) gave Kucinich a conservative rating of 9.73%, and for 2008, the liberal Americans for Democratic Action (ADA) gave him a liberal rating of 95%. He was often regarded as one of the most liberal members of the United States House of Representatives. Describing his views in the 2008 Democratic Party presidential primaries, he said, "I'm from the universal-health-care wing of the Democratic Party. I'm from the Roe v. Wade-litmus-test wing of the Democratic Party. I'm from the abolish-the-death-penalty wing of the Democratic Party." Kucinich has been long been described as a left-wing and progressive populist.

=== Abortion ===
Until 2002, Kucinich's voting record was strongly anti-abortion, but he maintained a pro-abortion rights stance thereafter. In 1996, he was quoted as saying that "life begins at conception", and he voted in favor of banning partial birth abortion and preventing the transport of minors to undergo abortion procedures. He said in a 2003 interview that he had a "journey" on the abortion issue that "caused me to break from a voting record that had not been pro-choice".

=== Attempted impeachment of George W. Bush ===
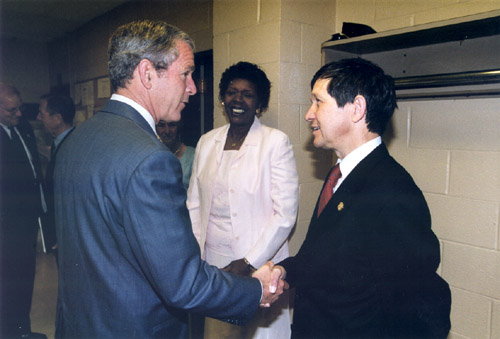
Kucinich with President George W. Bush in 2002

On June 10, 2008, Kucinich introduced 35 articles of impeachment against President George W. Bush on the floor of the House of Representatives. On June 11, the resolution was referred to the House Judiciary Committee.

Calling it "a sworn duty" of Congress to act, co-sponsor Robert Wexler said, "President Bush deliberately created a massive propaganda campaign to sell the war in Iraq to the American people, and the charges detailed in this impeachment resolution indicate an unprecedented abuse of executive power." On July 10, 2008, Kucinich introduced an additional article of impeachment accusing Bush of misleading Congress into war. On July 14, 2008, Kucinich introduced a new resolution of impeachment against Bush, charging him with manufacturing evidence to sway public opinion in favor of the war in Iraq. This resolution was also sent to the judiciary committee.

=== Attempted impeachment of Dick Cheney ===
On April 17, 2007, Kucinich sent a letter to his Democratic colleagues saying that he planned to file an impeachment resolution against Dick Cheney, then Vice President of the United States. Kucinich planned to introduce the impeachment articles on April 24, 2007, but in light of Cheney's visit to his doctor for an inspection of a blood clot, Kucinich postponed the press conference "until the vice president's condition is clarified".

Kucinich held a press conference on April 24, 2007, revealing House Resolution 333 and the three articles of impeachment against Cheney. He charged Cheney with manipulating the evidence of Iraq's weapons program, deceiving the nation about Iraq's connection to al-Qaeda, and threatening aggression against Iran in violation of the United Nations charter. Kucinich opened his press conference by quoting from the Declaration of Independence, and said, "I believe the Vice President's conduct of office has been destructive to the founding purposes of our nation. Today, I have introduced House Resolution 333, Articles of Impeachment Relating to Vice President Richard B. Cheney. I do so in defense of the rights of the American people to have a government that is honest and peaceful."

On November 6, 2007, Kucinich used special parliamentary procedure and moved for a vote on impeaching Cheney. House Majority Leader Steny Hoyer and House Speaker Pelosi opposed the measure and stood by previous comments that "impeachment is not on our agenda", and they initially moved to table the bill. When that attempt failed, Hoyer moved to refer the bill to the House Judiciary Committee. That motion succeeded.

=== Banking ===
Kucinich criticized the bank bailout of 2008 as a "handout to Wall Street" lacking workouts for homeowners. He introduced the NEED Act, a monetary reform bill.

=== Barack Obama ===
In March 2011, Kucinich said that Obama's decision to approve air strikes against Muammar Gaddafi's forces in the Libyan Civil War was an "impeachable offense."

=== Cannabis ===
During his 2004 presidential campaign, Kucinich expressed support for a drug policy that "sets reasonable boundaries for marijuana use by establishing guidelines similar to those already in place for alcohol". He stated: "Most marijuana users do so responsibly, in a safe, recreational context. These people lead normal, productive lives — pursuing careers, raising families and participating in civic life." Kucinich also released a detailed plan for cannabis policy reform during his 2018 campaign for Ohio governor.

=== Civil liberties ===
Kucinich has opposed the USA PATRIOT Act since its inception. He voted against the act in 2001, and against its renewal in 2006. He voted for an amendment to the constitution outlawing flag burning and desecration, but later took the opposite stance, voting against a similar amendment in 2005.

In 2007, Kucinich voted to require the Department of Defense to present a detailed plan for transferring prisoners out of Guantanamo Bay detention camp.

=== Donald Trump ===
Kucinich has praised and defended President Donald Trump in Fox News appearances. He praised Trump's inaugural speech, calling it "GREAT" and a "message of unity".

According to The Washington Post, Kucinich "was a rare left-wing voice attacking 'the deep state' for undermining the president." On Sean Hannity's show, Kucinich said he believed that a deep state intelligence community worked against Trump and that it was "very dangerous to America", "a threat to our republic" and "a clear and present danger to our way of life." In February 2017, Kucinich defended Michael Flynn, saying that the intelligence community had treated him unfairly; in December 2017, Flynn pleaded guilty to lying to the FBI. Kucinich defended Trump's claims that he was being wiretapped, saying that he himself had been wiretapped. He also defended Trump's efforts to improve relations with Russia.

Kucinich criticized some House Democrats for attempting to start impeachment proceedings against Trump. He said, "The Democratic Party had best be identified with something more than impeachment." He said that efforts to assess Trump's mental and physical fitness to be president were "destroying the party as an effective opposition."

After the January 6 United States Capitol attack that attempted to overturn Trump's defeat, Kucinich denounced the storming as "an affront to the U.S. Constitution".

=== Environment and energy ===
Kucinich had a 100% rating during 2005 and 2006 from the League of Conservation Voters, indicating pro-environment votes. He has said that clean water is "a basic human right".

As mayor of Cleveland, Kucinich favored the city's existing Municipal Light System and opposed construction of the Davis-Besse Nuclear Power Plant and Perry Nuclear Power Plant on Lake Erie. He opposed a planned regional radioactive waste dump, and has long advocated renewable energy and efficient energy use.

=== Fairness Doctrine ===
Kucinich was involved in efforts to bring back the Fairness Doctrine, requiring radio stations to give liberal and conservative points of view equal time, which he and other critics of talk radio argue is not presently the case. Fellow Democrat Maurice Hichney, Vermont's independent Senator Bernie Sanders, and others have joined him in this effort. Conservatives have criticized these plans, alleging that what they believe to be a liberal-dominated Hollywood, academia, new media, and mainstream media would not be subject to these regulations.

=== Foreign policy ===
Kucinich is a supporter of a non-interventionist foreign policy and has called war a profitable racket.

Kucinich voted against the authorization of military force against Iraq in 2002. He also voted consistently against funding the war.

In a visit to the rest of the Middle East in September 2007, Kucinich said he did not visit Iraq because "I feel the United States is engaging in an illegal occupation."

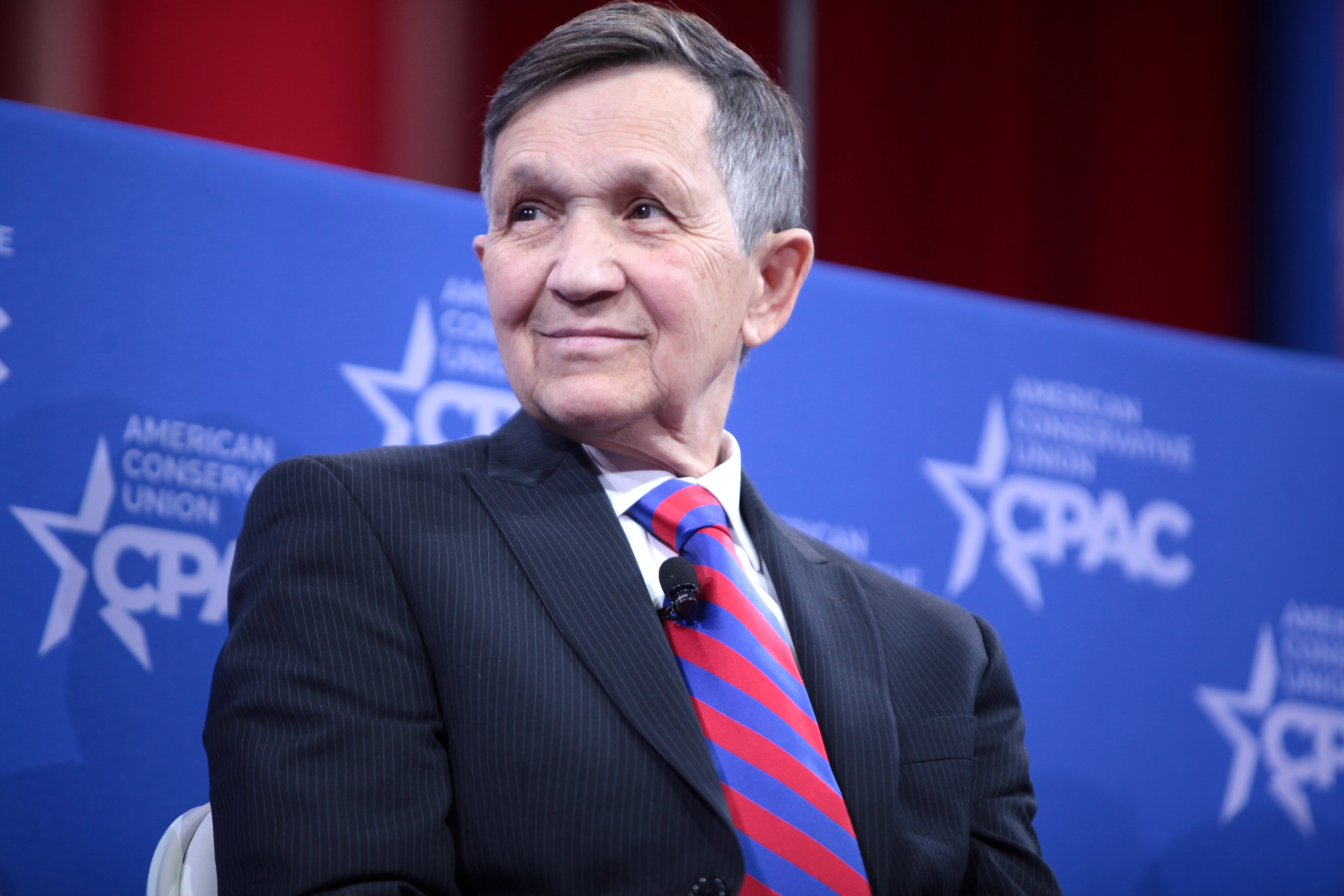
Dennis Kucinich speaking at the 2015 Conservative Political Action Conference (CPAC) in National Harbor, Maryland, on February 27, 2015.

Kucinich objected to the 2011 military intervention in Libya missile strikes and suggested they were impeachable offenses. He also asked why Democratic leaders didn't object when Obama told them of his plan for US participation in enforcing the Libyan no-fly zone. He said Obama's action in Libya was "a grave decision that cannot be made by the president alone", and that failing to first seek Congress's approval was unconstitutional.

On August 31, Al Jazeera reported that a document had been found in the Libyan intelligence agency's headquarters that according to the author appeared to be a summary of a conversation between Kucinich and an intermediary for Saif al-Islam Gaddafi in which Kucinich asks for information about the anti-Gaddafi National Transitional Council (NTC), possible links between it and al-Qaeda, and evidence of corruption, to lobby US lawmakers to put an end to NATO airstrikes and suspend their support for the NTC. It also listed information necessary to defend al-Islam against International Criminal Court war crimes charges. Kucinich defended himself in a message to The Atlantic Wire, saying that the document was simply a summary of Kucinich's public positions on the Libyan campaign by a Libyan bureaucrat who never consulted Kucinich. "Al Jazeera found a document written by a Libyan bureaucrat to other Libyan bureaucrats. All it proves is that the Libyans were reading The Washington Post... Any implication I was doing anything other than trying to bring an end to an unauthorized war is fiction."

In March 2011, Kucinich criticized the Obama administration's decision to participate in the NATO intervention in Libya without Congressional authorization. He also called it an "indisputable fact" that Obama's decision was an impeachable offense since he believes the U.S. Constitution "does not provide for the president to wage war any times he pleases", but he did not introduce a resolution to impeach Obama. In response, Libyan officials invited Kucinich to visit that country on a "peace mission", but he declined, saying that he "could not negotiate on behalf of the administration."

Kucinich was criticized for his visit to Syria in 2007 and praise of President Bashar al-Assad on Syrian national TV. He praised Syria for taking in Iraqi refugees. "What most people are not aware of is that Syria has taken in more than 1.5 million Iraqi refugees," Kucinich said. "The Syrian government has actually shown a lot of compassion in keeping its doors open, and being a host for so many refugees."

Kucinich has met with Assad on several occasions. He has supported Assad, citing him as a lesser evil in the Syrian Civil War. Asked by Tucker Carlson how he could defend a war criminal, Kucinich said the choice was to let ISIS take over Syria or "try to stabilize the region and let the people of Syria make their own decisions about who their leaders are going to be". He helped Fox News get an interview with Assad.

In October 2016, Kucinich warned against a prospective United States military intervention against Russia in Syria. He argued that "a concerted effort is being made through fearmongering, propaganda, and lies to prepare our country for a dangerous confrontation, with Russia in Syria" and said that Russia was being demonized as part of a "calculated plan to resurrect a raison d'être for stone-cold warriors trying to escape from the dustbin of history by evoking the specter of Russian world domination."

=== Guns ===
Kucinich is graded "F" by the NRA Political Victory Fund, indicating a pro-gun control voting record. He also received a 100% lifetime rating from the Brady Campaign to Prevent Gun Violence.

=== Health care ===
Kucinich believes that health care is a "right in a democratic society". He is a critic of the for-profit health insurance and pharmaceutical industries, and is concerned about the large number of uninsured and underinsured in the United States. He contends that if the for-profit insurance system's overhead, such as "stock options, executive salaries, [and] advertising", were used for medically necessary care, there would be enough money in the system to cover everyone at no extra cost.

In July 2009, the House Education and Labor Committee approved an amendment by Kucinich to its version of the unsuccessful America's Affordable Health Choices Act of 2009 by a vote of 27–19, with 14 Democrats and 13 Republicans voting for it. The amendment empowers the Secretary of Health and Human Services to waive the federal law that preempts state law on employee-related health care, the Employee Retirement Income Security Act, in response to state requests. It has been speculated that the amendment's bipartisan support was for its appeal to states' rights in supporting progressive legislation. In the past, states attempting to enact single-payer reforms had been sued and stopped under ERISA. It has also been speculated that the law would open up vital new avenues for promoting and implementing a single-payer system, as newly unbound states would show single-payer's success, just as Saskatchewan did for Canada. But the Kucinich Amendment was stripped from the merged House bill. Speaker Nancy Pelosi said that it would have violated Obama's promise that Americans who liked their health insurance could keep it.

In March 2010, Kucinich announced that he supported the Affordable Care Act, after previously indicating opposition. According to The Washington Post, his switch was the first in a vital flurry of holdout representatives switching to yes votes.

=== LGBT rights ===
Kucinich supports same-sex marriage. He voted for the expansion of hate crime laws in the United States and against banning LGBT adoption in Washington, D.C.

=== Trade ===
Kucinich has consistently opposed free trade, claiming that it costs American jobs and enables abusive working conditions in other countries.

=== Youth rights ===
In a Democratic debate during the 2008 Presidential Election, Kucinich and Mike Gravel were the only two candidates to favor lowering the legal drinking age to 18. Kucinich also supported lowering the voting age to 16.

== Recognition ==
In 2003, Kucinich received the Gandhi Peace Award, an annual award bestowed by the Religious Society of Friends-affiliated organization Promoting Enduring Peace. In 2010, the US Peace Memorial Foundation awarded him The US Peace Prize "in recognition of his national leadership to prevent and end wars".

After Kucinich lost to Marcy Kaptur in the 2012 Democratic primary, Representative Keith Ellison said of Kucinich, "At the end of the day, we're really going to miss Dennis. Dennis is a transformative leader. He stood up and spoke eloquently, passionately about Iraq, Afghanistan, Iran. He was a consistent voice for peace... He almost didn't vote for the health care bill because it wasn't good enough."

== Personal life ==
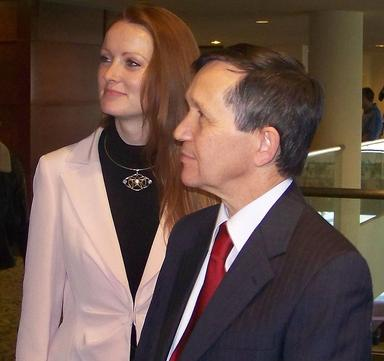
Dennis and Elizabeth Kucinich in 2008

Kucinich was baptized a Catholic. His first marriage, to Helen Kucinich, ended in divorce. He married Sandra Lee McCarthy in 1977; they had a daughter, Jackie, in 1981 and divorced in 1986. He married his third wife, British citizen Elizabeth Harper, on August 21, 2005. They met while Harper was working as an assistant for the Chicago-based American Monetary Institute, which brought her to Kucinich's House of Representatives office for a meeting. Kucinich, a vegan since 1995, is an advocate of veganism, like Elizabeth.

Kucinich had four brothers and two sisters. Perry Kucinich, his youngest brother, died in 2007. His youngest sister, Beth Ann Kucinich, died in 2008.

In 2011, Kucinich sued a Capitol Hill cafeteria for damages after a 2008 incident in which he claimed to have suffered a severe injury biting into a sandwich and breaking a tooth on an olive pit. The broken tooth became infected, and complications led to three surgeries for dental work. The lawsuit, for $150,000 in punitive damages, was settled with the defendant agreeing to pay Kucinich's costs.

== Bibliography ==
- The Courage To Survive ISBN 9781597775687
- A Prayer for America
- The Division Of Light And Power (June 2021) ISBN 9781638772347

== See also ==
- Kucinich Resolution
- List of peace activists

Political offices
Preceded by Ralph Perk	Mayor of Cleveland; 1978–1979	Succeeded by George Voinovich
U.S. House of Representatives
Preceded by Martin Hoke	Member of the U.S. House of Representatives from Ohio's 10th congressional district 1997–2013	Succeeded by Mike Turner
Party political offices
Preceded by Bernie Sanders	Chair of the Congressional Progressive Caucus; 1999–2003	Succeeded by Peter DeFazio
U.S. order of precedence (ceremonial)
Preceded by Deborah Pryce as Former U.S. Representative	Order of precedence of the United States as Former U.S. Representative	Succeeded by Pat Tiberi as Former U.S. Representative
