= Credit theory of money =

Economic theory

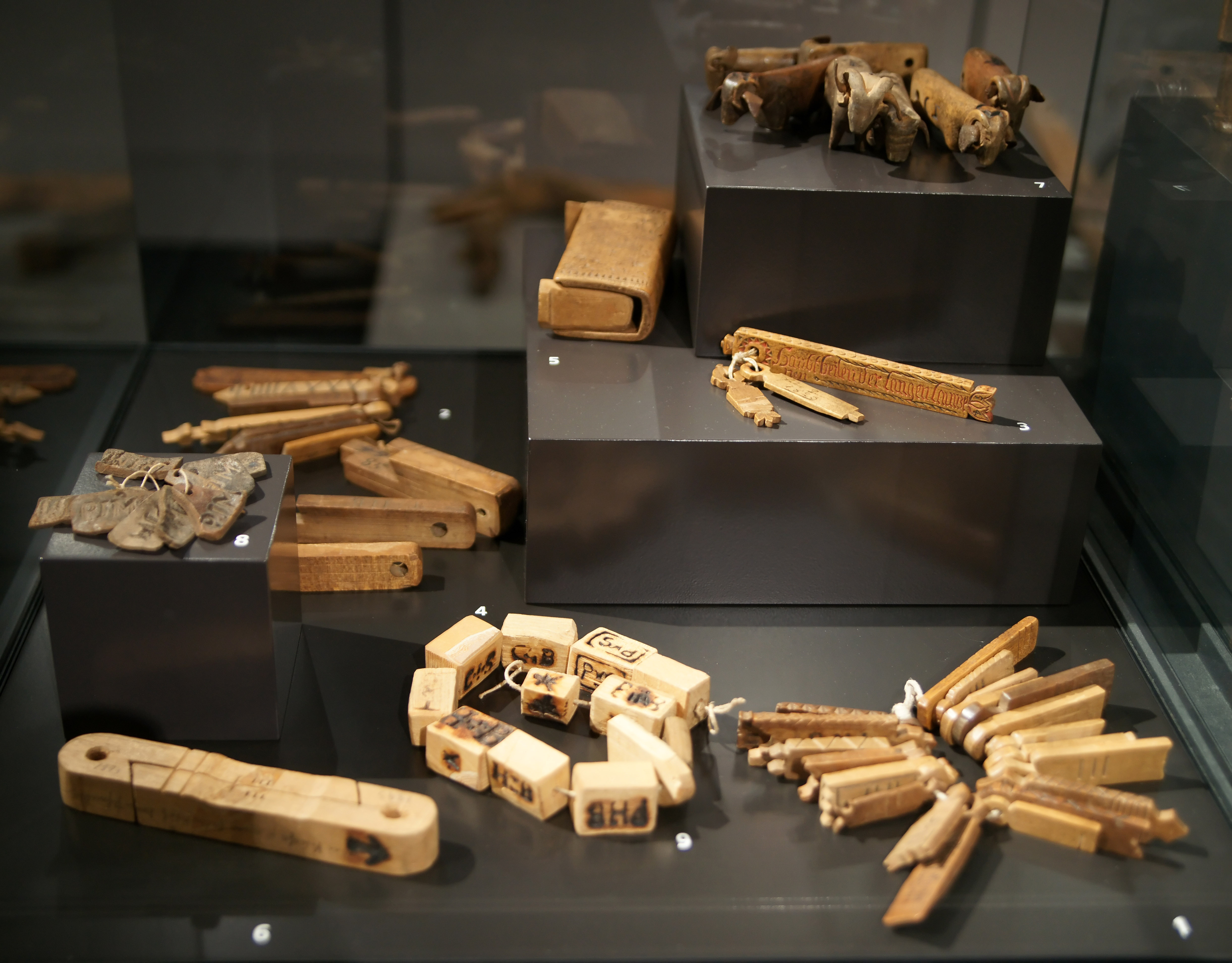
Single and split tally sticks in the Swiss Alpine Museum – similar items may have been used in debt based economic systems thought to pre-date the use of coinage.

Credit theories of money, also called debt theories of money, are monetary economic theories concerning the relationship between credit and money. Proponents of these theories, such as Alfred Mitchell-Innes, sometimes emphasize that money and credit/debt are the same thing, seen from different points of view. Proponents assert that the essential nature of money is credit (debt), at least in eras where money is not backed by a commodity such as gold. Two common strands of thought within these theories are the idea that money originated as a unit of account for debt, and the position that money creation involves the simultaneous creation of debt. Some proponents of credit theories of money argue that money is best understood as debt even in systems often understood as using commodity money. Others hold that money equates to credit only in a system based on fiat money, where they argue that all forms of money including cash can be considered as forms of credit money.

The first formal credit theory of money arose in the 19th century. Anthropologist David Graeber has argued that for most of human history, money has been widely understood to represent debt, though he concedes that even prior to the modern era, there have been several periods where rival theories like metallism have held sway.

== Scholarship ==
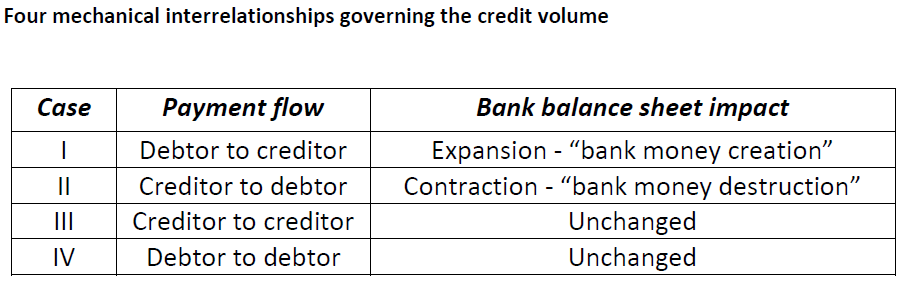
Four Interrelations in theory of "credit mechanics": Fundamental differences are relations in payment flows after given loans by commercial banks to nonbank sector.

According to Joseph Schumpeter, the first known advocate of a credit theory of money was Plato. Schumpeter describes metallism as the other of "two fundamental theories of money", saying the first known advocate of metallism was Aristotle. The earliest modern thinker to formulate a credit theory of money was Henry Dunning Macleod (1821–1902), with his work in the 19th century, most especially with his The Theory of Credit (1889). Macleod's work was expanded on by Alfred Mitchell-Innes in his papers What is Money? (1913) and The Credit Theory of Money (1914), where he argued against the then conventional view of money arising as a means to improve the practice of barter. In this alternative view, commerce and taxation created obligations between parties which were forms of credit and debt. Devices such as tally sticks were used to record these obligations and these then became negotiable instruments which could function as money. As Innes puts it in his 1914 article:

The Credit Theory is this: that a sale and purchase is the exchange of a commodity for credit. From this main theory springs the sub-theory that the value of credit or money does not depend on the value of any metal or metals, but on the right which the creditor acquires to "payment," that is to say, to satisfaction for the credit, and on the obligation of the debtor to "pay" his debt and conversely on the right of the debtor to release himself from his debt by the tender of an equivalent debt owed by the creditor, and the obligation of the creditor to accept this tender in satisfaction of his credit.

Innes goes on to note that a major problem in getting the public to understand the extent to which monetary systems are debt based is the challenge in persuading them that "things are not the way they seem".

Since the late 20th century, Innes' credit theory of money has been integrated into Modern Monetary Theory. The theory also combines elements of chartalism, noting that high-powered money is functionally an IOU from the state, and therefore, "all 'state money' is also 'credit money'". The state ensures there is demand for its IOUs by accepting them as payment for taxes, fees, fines, tithes, and tribute.

In his 2011 book Debt: The First 5000 Years, the anthropologist David Graeber asserted that the best available evidence suggests the original monetary systems were debt based, and that most subsequent systems have been too. Exceptions where the relationship between money and debt was less clear occurred during periods where money has been backed by bullion, as happens with a gold standard. Graeber echoes earlier theorists such as Innes by saying that during these eras population perception was that money derived its value from the precious metals of which the coins were made, but that even in these periods money is more accurately understood as debt. Graeber states that the three main functions of money are to act as: a medium of exchange; a unit of account; and a store of value. Graeber writes that since Adam Smith's time, economists have tended to emphasise money as a medium of exchange. For Graeber, when money first appeared its primary purpose was to act as a unit of account, to denominate debt. He writes that coins were originally created as tokens which represented a unit of account rather than being an amount of precious metal which could be bartered.

Economics commentator Philip Coggan holds that the world's current monetary system became debt-based after the Nixon shock, in which President Nixon suspended the link between money and gold in 1971. He writes that "Modern money is debt and debt is money". Since the 1971 Nixon Shock, debt creation and the creation of money increasingly took place at once. This simultaneous creation of money and debt occurs as a feature of fractional-reserve banking. After a commercial bank approves a loan, it is able to create the corresponding amount of money, which is then acquired by the borrower along with a similar amount of debt. Coggan goes on to say that debtors often prefer debt-based monetary systems such as fiat money over commodity-based systems like the gold standard, because the former tend to allow much higher volumes of money to circulate in the economy, and tend to be more expansive. This makes their debts easier to repay. Coggan refers to William Jennings Bryan's 19th century Cross of Gold speech as one of the first great attempts to weaken the link between gold and money; he says the former US presidential candidate was trying to expand the monetary base in the interests of indebted farmers, who at the time were often being forced into bankruptcy. However Coggan also says that the excessive debt which can be built up under a debt-based monetary system can end up hurting all sections of society, including debtors.

In a 2012 paper, economic theorist Perry Mehrling notes that what is commonly regarded as money can often be viewed as debt. He posits a hierarchy of assets with gold at the top, then currency, then deposits and then securities. The lower down the hierarchy, the easier it is to view the asset as reflecting someone else's debt. A later 2012 paper from Claudio Borio of the BIS made the contrary case that it is loans that give rise to deposits, rather than the other way round. In a book published in June 2013, Felix Martin argued that credit based theories of money are correct, citing earlier work by Macleod: "currency ... represents transferable debt, and nothing else". Martin writes that it's difficult for people to grasp the nature of money, because money is such a central part of society, and alludes to the Chinese proverb that "If you want to know what water is like, don't ask the fish."

In 2014, Richard Werner found:

… it has been empirically demonstrated that each individual bank creates credit and money out of nothing, when it extends what is called a ‘bank loan’. The bank does not loan any existing money, but instead creates new money. The money supply is created as ‘fairy dust’ produced by the banks out of thin air.

== Advocacy ==
The conception that money is essentially equivalent to credit or debt has long been used by those advocating particular reforms of the monetary system, and by commentators calling for various monetary policy responses to events such as the 2008 financial crisis. A view held in common by most recent advocates, from all shades of political opinion, is that money can be equated with debt in the context of the contemporary monetary system. The view that money is equivalent to debt even in systems based on commodity money tends to be held only by those to the left of the political spectrum. Regardless of any commonality in their understanding of credit theories of money, the actual reforms proposed by advocates of different political orientations are sometimes diametrically opposed.

=== Advocacy for a return to a gold standard or similar commodity based system ===
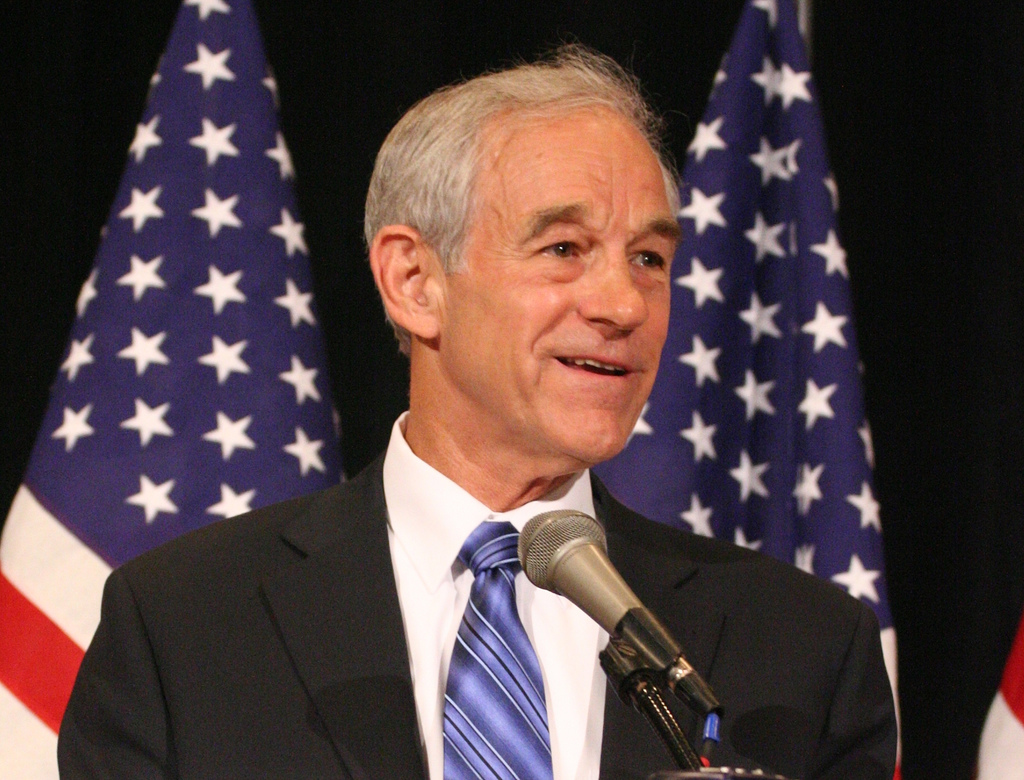
Former US presidential candidate Ron Paul has spoken out against fiat money, partly on the grounds that it encourages the buildup of debt.

Advocates from an Austrian School, right-libertarian perspective often hold that money is equivalent to debt in our current monetary system, but that it need not be in one where money is linked to a commodity, such as a gold standard. They have frequently used this view point to support arguments that it would be best to return to a gold standard, to other forms of commodity money, or at least to a monetary system where money has positive value. Similar views are also occasionally expressed by conservatives. As an example of the latter, former British minister of state The Earl of Caithness made a 1997 speech in the House of Lords where he stated that since the 1971 Nixon shock, the British money supply had grown by 2145% and personal debt had risen by almost 3000%. He argued that Britain ought to move from its current "debt-based monetary system" to one based on equity:

It is also a good time to stand back, to reassess whether our economy is soundly based. I would contest that it is not ... as it is debt-based ... a system which by its very actions causes the value of money to decrease is dishonest and has within it its own seeds of destruction. We did not vote for it. It grew upon us gradually but markedly since 1971 when the commodity-based system was abandoned...We all want our businesses to succeed, but under the existing system the irony is that the better our banks, building societies and lending institutions do, the more debt is created ... There is a different way: it is an equity-based system and one in which those businesses can play a responsible role. The next government must grasp the nettle, accept their responsibility for controlling the money supply and change from our debt-based monetary system. My Lords, will they? If they do not, our monetary system will break us and the sorry legacy we are already leaving our children will be a disaster.

In the early to mid-1970s, a return to a gold-anchored system was advocated by gold-rich creditor countries including France and Germany. A return has repeatedly been advocated by libertarians, as they tend to see commodity money as far preferable to fiat money. Since the 2008 crisis and the rapid rise in the price of gold that soon followed it, a return to a gold standard has frequently been advocated by gold bugs.

=== Advocacy for a Federal Monetary Authority ===
In 1934, Thomas Alan Goldsborough introduced bills and held hearings on establishing an independent Federal Monetary Authority. The Monetary Authority alone would issue legal tender currency under Article I, Section 8, in the Enumerated Powers, to coin money and regulate the value thereof. This would replace the privilege of banks to issue banknotes. The President would appoint 7 directors representing industry, agriculture, and banking.

Supporters included Irving Fisher and Frank A. Vanderlip.

Franklin D. Roosevelt's economic advisor Lauchlin Currie had a Federal Monetary Authority plan with 5 directors.

The NEED Act of 2011 called for a Federal Monetary Authority.

=== Advocacy against the gold standard ===
From centrist and left-wing perspectives, credit theories of money have been used to oppose the gold standard while it was still in effect, and to reject arguments for its reinstatement. Innes's 1914 paper is an early example of this.

=== Advocacy for expansionary monetary policy ===
From a moderate mainstream perspective, Martin Wolf has argued that since most money in our contemporary system is already being dual-created with debt by private banks, there is no reason to oppose monetary creation by central banks in order to support monetary policy such as quantitative easing. In Wolf's view, the argument against Q.E. on the grounds that it creates debt is offset by potential benefits to economic growth and employment, and because the increase in debt would be temporary and easy to reverse.

=== Advocacy for debt cancellation ===
Arguments for debt forgiveness have long been made from people of all political orientations; as an example, in 2010 hedge fund manager Hugh Hendry, a strong believer in free markets, argued for a partial cancellation of Greece's debt as part of the solution to the euro area crisis. But generally advocates of debt forgiveness simply point out that debts are too high in relation to the debtors’ ability to repay; they don't make reference to a debt-based theory of money. Exceptions include David Graeber who has used credit theories of money to argue against recent trends to strengthen the enforcement of debt collection, such as greater use of custodial sentences against debtors in the US. He also argued against the over-zealous application of the view that paying one's debts is central to morality, and has proposed the enactment of a biblical style Jubilee where debts will be cancelled for all.

== Relationship with other theories of money ==
Debt theories of money fall into a broader category of work which postulates that monetary creation is endogenous.

Historically, debt theories of money have overlapped with chartalism and were opposed to metallism. This largely remains the case today, especially in the forms commonly held by those to the left of the political spectrum. Conversely, in the forms held by late 20th-century and 21st-century advocates with a conservative libertarian perspective, debt theories of money are often compatible with the quantity theory of money and with metallism, at least when the latter is broadly understood.

== See also ==
- Demand Note
- Fractional-reserve banking, an hypothesis on how bank credit creation works
- Financial intermediary, another model on how banks work
- Jubilee Debt Coalition
- Trillion-dollar coin
