= NEED Act =

2010 American monetary reform bill

The National Emergency Employment Defense Act, aka the NEED Act, was a monetary reform bill first sponsored by Congressman Dennis Kucinich in 2010 in the United States House of Representatives.

== Introduction ==
Dennis Kucinich (D), representative for Ohio's 10th congressional district, introduced H.R. 6550 on December 17, 2010. He re-introduced a slightly modified H.R. 2990 to the 112th Congress, on September 21, 2011. Kucinich claimed that "H.R. 2990 enables money to be issued by spending it into circulation on programs approved by Congress — without taxing or borrowing." The bill was co-sponsored by John Conyers (D), representative for Michigan's 13th congressional district.

== Titles ==
The legislation's aim, according to its sponsor, was

To create a full employment economy as a matter of national economic defense; to provide for public investment in capital infrastructure; to provide for reducing the cost of public investment; to retire public debt; to stabilize the Social Security retirement system; to restore the authority of Congress to create and regulate money, modernize and provide stability for the monetary system of the United States; and for other public purposes.

== Summary ==
According to the Congressional Research Service, a nonpartisan division of the Library of Congress, the NEED Act, in brief, would replace "Federal Reserve notes" with "United States Money" and dismantle the Fed. In this, the Act

- Instructs the Secretary of the Treasury to originate "United States Money" to address any negative fund deficit spending;
- Subjects to criminal and civil penalties any person who engages in "fractional reserve banking;"
- Prohibits federal borrowing (except by a national bank, federal savings association, or federal credit union) from any source other than the Treasury;
- Requires the Treasury Secretary to begin the process of retiring all outstanding U.S. debt by paying the bearers in "United States Money;"
- Directs the Treasury Secretary to purchase all net financial assets in the Federal Reserve System, including the Federal reserve banks, and to return all reserves held by the Fed to the member banks in the form of "United States Money;"
- Establishes various institutions to replace the Fed System: (1) the Monetary Authority responsible for monetary supply policy; (2) the Bureau of the Federal Reserve that administers "United States Money;" (3) the Emergency Board tasked with recommending to Congress when a national emergency requires the President to issue a certification of emergency for the exercise of authority by the Monetary Authority as lender of last resort; and (4) a revolving loan fund in the Treasury for re-lending to banking institutions.
- Sets forth a conversion process to replace fractional reserve banking with the lending of "United States Money;"
- Sets a ceiling on interest rates.

== Unemployment ==
Additionally, the Act would earmark funds for federal outlays in order to "create 50 million jobs" nationwide, in projects such as "federal & state infrastructure investment, education, health care," etc.

== Support ==
The bill's introduction was "enthusiastically" supported by the American Monetary Institute, whose director, Stephen Zarlenga, helped draft early versions of the bill. and other opponents of fractional reserve banking, as well as by opponents of the Federal System, in general, such as the Positive Money organisation.

Kucinich stated that the bill would remove the power of creating money from the "privately owned and controlled" Federal Reserve System and would restore the authority of the U.S. Congress to "create money interest-free." He added that the bill would "address" America's "structural economic problems directly by creating over 7 million jobs" at a time when "the nation struggles with long-term unemployment at rates not seen in generations, and as infrastructure crumbles across the nation."

According to supporters and people who endorsed Kucinich's candidacy for Congress, the bill "would create millions of private sector jobs and rebuild America's infrastructure while paying off the national debt, all without raising taxes," while many supporters of the Occupy movement voiced similar sentiments. The Green Party in New York, in its official platform, has endorsed the NEED Act, while other Green Party organizations have endorsed the notions advocated in the bill, in a platform called "Greening the Dollar."

== Criticism ==
The argument for "United States Money," as opposed to Fed-issued money, is not new. As far back as 1943, Abba Lerner had dismissed such arguments, pointing out that the central bank can, at any time, start "printing money" to match government deficit-spending "sufficient to achieve and sustain full employment." (Note: Lerner : The central idea is that government fiscal policy, its spending and taxing, its borrowing and repayment of loans, its issue of new money and its withdrawal of money, shall all be undertaken with an eye only to the results of these actions on the economy and not to any established traditional doctrine about what is sound or unsound. This principle of judging only by effects has been applied in many other fields of human activity, where it is known as the method of science opposed to scholasticism. The principle of judging fiscal measures by the way they work or function in the economy we may call Functional Finance. Government should adjust its rates of expenditure and taxation such that total spending in the economy is neither more nor less than that which is sufficient to purchase the full employment level of output at current prices. If this means there is a deficit, greater borrowing, "printing money," etc., then these things in themselves are neither good nor bad, they are simply the means to the desired ends of full employment and price stability.)

Post Keynesian economists, such as L. Randall Wray, have argued repeatedly on the "foolishness" of notions such as promoted by the NEED Act, pointing out that if money does not represent debt, in the form of a tax credit, then it is useless. (Note: Wray: "In the case of a government that issues its own sovereign currency without a promise to convert at a fixed value to gold or foreign currency, taxes are not needed to "pay for" government spending. Further, the logic is reversed: government must spend or lend the currency into the economy before taxpayers can pay taxes in the form of the currency. Spend first, tax later is the logical sequence.") (Note: Wray : "FRReserves are keystroke entries, representing the Fed's liability and the asset of depositors. Only a bank, a foreign central bank, or some other special entity, can hold these. In theory, the government should accept its central-bank notes in tax payment. In practice, US taxpayers make tax payments using their banks—either with checks or direct withdrawal. The Fed then debits the private bank's reserve deposits. In either case, the Fed's liabilities to the US private sector are reduced.)

Economist and investor Warren Mosler has pointed out that the NEED Act is an "innocent fraud," because it undertakes to end a system that has ceased to exist a long time ago. (Note: Mosler: "Fractional reserve banking ended in 1934 when [the U.S.] went off the gold standard. Today's banking is not reserve constrained.")

== Outcome ==
The United States House Financial Services Subcommittee on Domestic Monetary Policy and Technology held hearings on the NEED Act.

== See also ==
- Greenbacks
- Gold standard
- Stephen Zarlenga
