= Monetary policy of the United States =

Political Policy

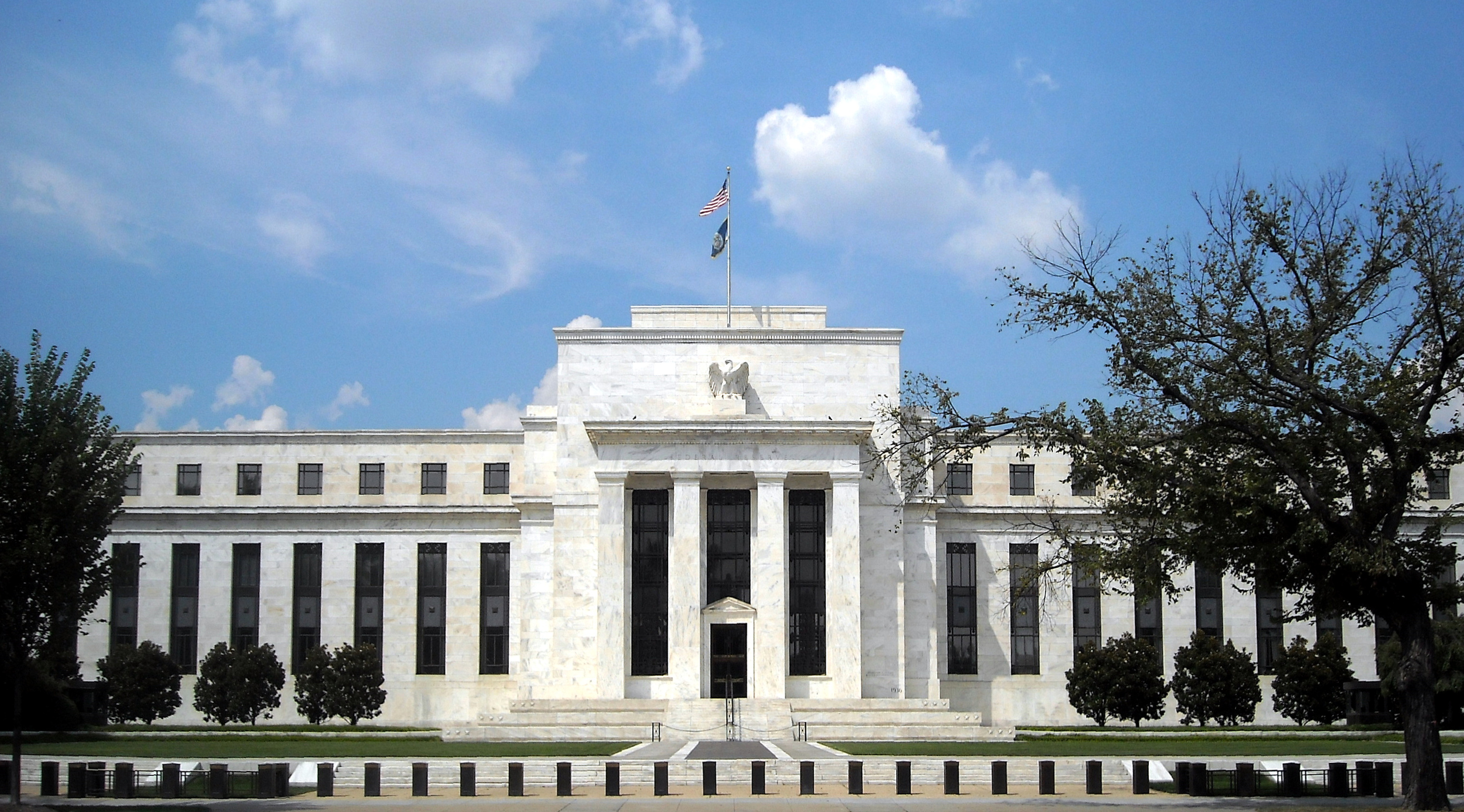
The Headquarters of the Federal Reserve System in Washington, D.C.

The monetary policy of the United States is the set of policies that the Federal Reserve follows to achieve its twin objectives (or dual mandate) of high employment and stable inflation.

The US central bank, the Federal Reserve System, colloquially known as "the Fed", was created in 1913 by the Federal Reserve Act as the monetary authority of the United States. The Federal Reserve's board of governors along with the Federal Open Market Committee (FOMC) are consequently the primary arbiters of monetary policy in the United States.

The U.S. Congress has established three key objectives for monetary policy in the Federal Reserve Act: maximizing employment, stabilizing prices, and moderating long-term interest rates. Because long-term interest rates remain moderate in a stable economy with low expected inflation, the last objective will be fulfilled automatically together with the first two ones, so that the objectives are often referred to as a dual mandate of promoting maximum employment and stable prices. The Fed operationalizes its objective of stable prices as following an inflation target of 2% annual inflation on average.

The Federal Reserve's main monetary policy instrument is its federal funds rate target. By adjusting this target, the Fed affects a wide range of market interest rates and in turn indirectly affects stock prices, wealth and currency exchange rates. Through these variables, monetary policy influences spending, investment, production, employment and inflation in the United States. These channels are collectively known as the monetary transmission mechanism. Effective monetary policy complements fiscal policy to support economic stability, dampening the impact of business cycles.

Besides conducting monetary policy, the Fed is tasked to promote the stability of the financial system and regulate financial institutions, and to act as lender of last resort. In addition, the Fed should foster safety and efficiency in the payment and settlement system and promote consumer protection and community development.

== Interest rates and transmission mechanism ==
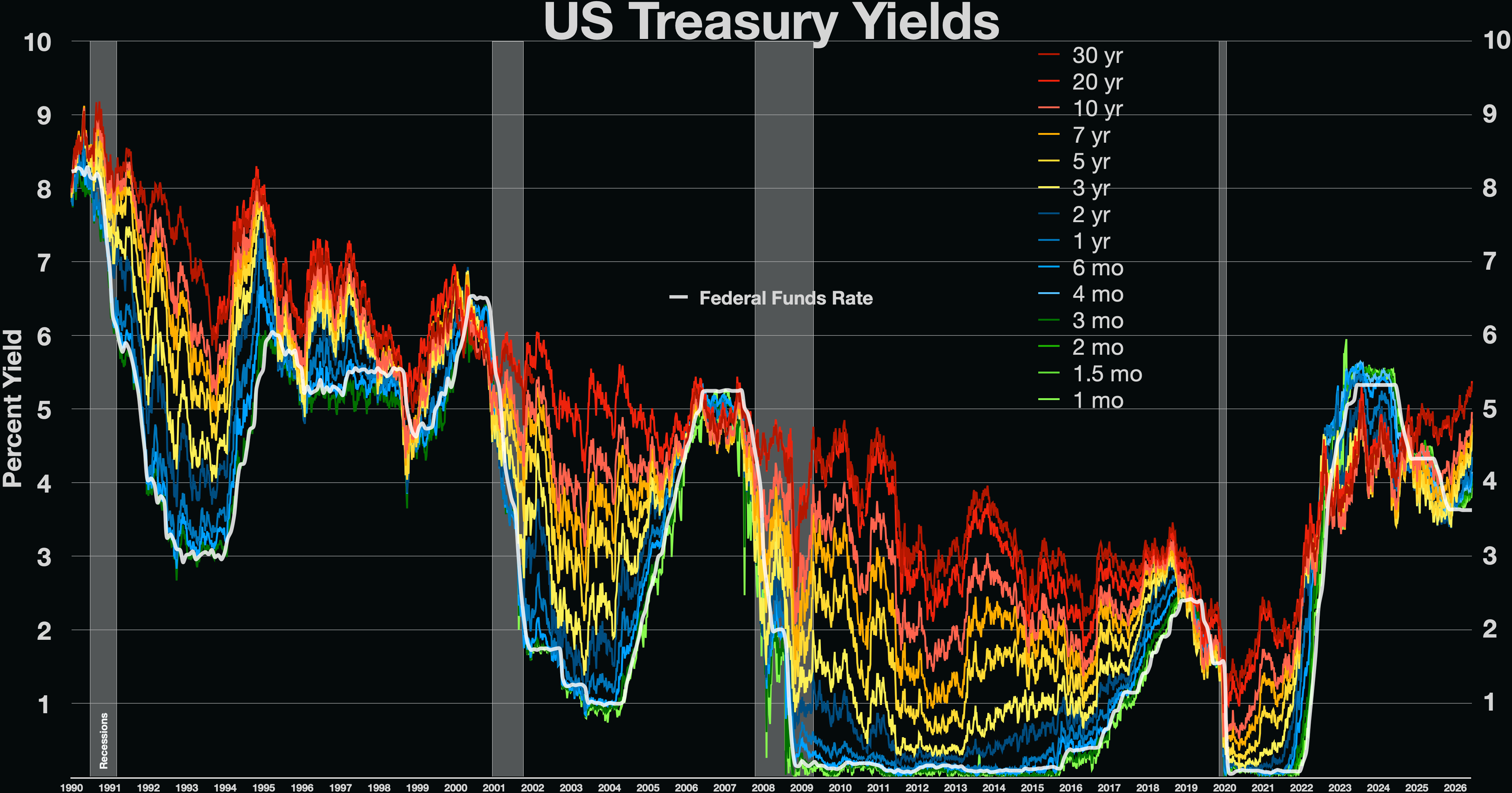
US Treasury interest rates compared to Federal Funds Rate

Monetary policy works by stimulating or suppressing the overall demand for goods and services in the economy, which tends to respectively increase or diminish employment and inflation. The Federal Reserve's primary means to this end is adjusting the target for the Federal funds rate (FFR) suitably. Changes in the Federal funds rate targets normally affect the interest rates that banks and other lenders charge on loans to firms and households, which will in turn impact private investment and consumption. Interest rate changes also affect asset prices like stock prices and house prices, which again influence households' consumption decisions through a wealth effect. Additionally, international interest rate differentials affect exchange rates and consequently US exports and imports. Consumption, investment and net exports are all important components of aggregate demand.

Hence, by lowering the federal funds rate the Federal Reserve can stimulate aggregate demand, raising employment levels and inflation when inflation falls short of the 2% annual inflation target. Conversely, when inflation is too high, the Fed can tighten monetary policy by raising the federal funds rate, which will diminish economic activity and consequently dampen inflation. The various channels summarized above through which the Federal Reserve's actions affect the general interest rate level and consequently the overall economy are collectively referred to as the monetary transmission mechanism.

In some cases, the Fed may raise the FFR to the extent that the shorter term interest rates rise sufficiently to climb above their longer maturity bonds, causing an inverted yield curve. This scenario usually predates a recession, which is deflationary.

== Implementation and policy tools ==
The Federal funds rate is a market interest rate, being the rate at which banks and credit unions lend reserve balances to each other overnight on an uncollateralized basis. The Fed consequently does not determine this rate directly, but has over time used various means to influence the rate. Until the 2008 financial crisis, the Fed relied on open market operations, i.e. selling and buying securities in the open market to adjust the supply of reserve balances so as to keep the FFR close to the Fed's target. However, since 2008 the actual conduct of monetary policy implementation has changed considerably, using instead various administered interest rates (i.e., interest rates that are set directly by the Fed rather than being determined by the market forces of supply and demand) as the primary tools to steer short-term market interest rate towards the Fed's policy target, which from December 2008 has been expressed as a range of 25 basis points.

The present implementation regime, which has evolved since the 2008 financial crisis, is referred to as an "ample-reserves regime" as opposed to the earlier limited-reserves regime. In 2019, the Fed announced that it would continue to use this implementation regime over the longer run. The Fed's central policy tools are the interest on reserve balances rate (IORB) and the overnight reverse repurchase agreement offering rate (ON RRP rate). They are administered rates which the Fed pays on funds that commercial banks hold in their reserve balance accounts at the Fed and funds that large nonbank financial institutions deposit at the Fed, respectively. These rates set a floor on the rates at which banks are willing to lend excess cash to other private market participants. At the same time, the Fed operates a discount window in which it lends funds to banks at the discount rate (a third administered rate), which puts a ceiling on the federal funds rate, as banks are unlikely to borrow elsewhere at a higher interest rate than the discount rate. Open-market operations are no longer used to steer the FR, but still form part of the over-all monetary policy toolbox, as they are used to always maintain an ample supply of reserves. The Fed began forward guidance in January 2012 to communicate policy intentions.

To sum up, the policy instruments in the current ample-reserves regime are:

- Interest on reserve balances (IORB) - an administered interest rate paid on funds that commercial banks hold in their reserve balance accounts at the Fed
- Overnight reverse repurchase agreement (ON RRP) facility - the Fed's offer to many large nonbank financial institutions to deposit funds at the Fed and earn interest
- Discount window - the Fed's lending to banks at the discount rate
- Open market operations - the Fed's buying and selling of securities to maintain an ample supply of reserves

Reserve requirements, which have formerly been used as a policy tool to manipulate the money supply and in turn market interest rates, are no longer used as a policy tool, and indeed in March 2020 were effectively abolished when the Fed's reserve requirement ratios were set to zero.

== Money supply ==
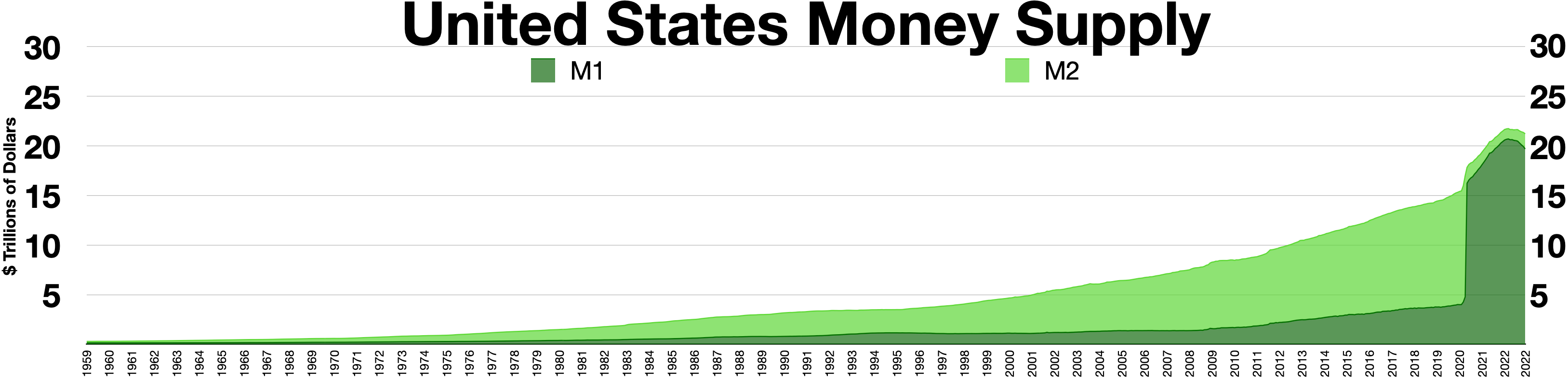
United States money supply M2 M1

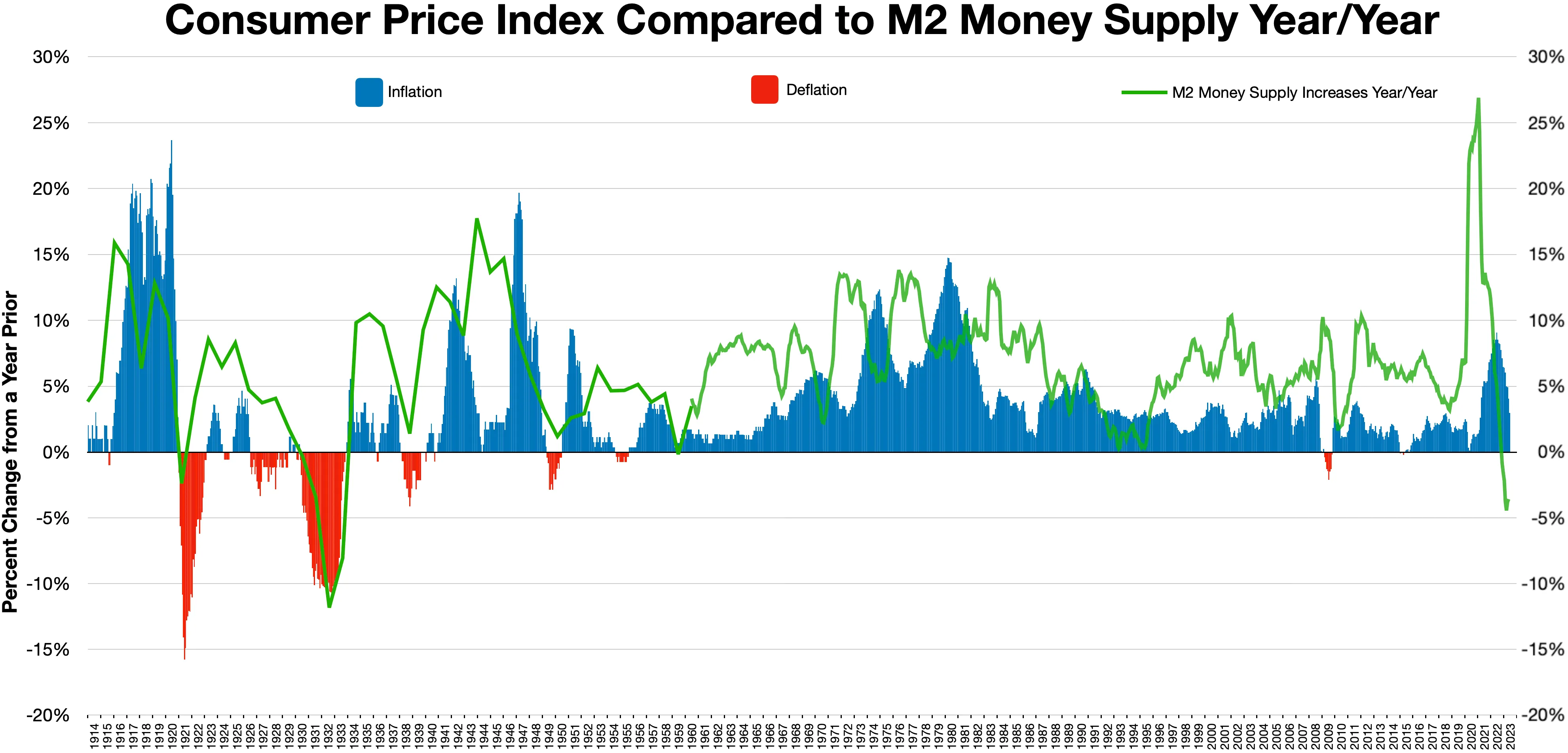
Inflation Deflation M2 money supply increases Year/Year

Monetary policy also generally affects the money supply. At times, changes in money supply measures have been closely related to important economic variables like GDP growth and inflation, and the Federal Reserve has earlier used these measures as an important guide in the conduct of monetary policy. In recent decades, however, these relationships have been quite unstable, and the importance of the money supply in this respect has consequently diminished over the years. Today, the Federal Open Market Committee reviews money supply data as just one part of a wide array of various financial and economic data which form the background for the Committee's monetary policy decisions,

The economy's aggregate money supply is the total of

- M0 money, or monetary base - "dollars" in currency and bank money balances credited to the central bank's depositors, which are backed by the central bank's assets,
- plus M1, M2, M3 money - "dollars" in the form of bank money balances credited to banks' depositors, which are backed by the bank's assets and investments.

The money supply thus has different components, generally broken down into "narrow" and "broad" money, reflecting the different degrees of liquidity ('spendability') of each different type, as broader forms of money can be converted into narrow forms of money (or may be readily accepted as money by others, such as personal checks). For example, demand deposits are technically promises to pay on demand, while savings deposits are promises to pay subject to some withdrawal restrictions, and Certificates of Deposit are promises to pay only at certain specified dates; each can be converted into money, but "narrow" forms of money can be converted more readily.

The Federal Reserve presently directly controls only the most narrow form of money, physical cash outstanding; the Federal Reserve indirectly influences the supply of other types of money. Until 2020, the Federal Reserve also used reserve requirements, enabling it to directly ensure a minimum of reserve balances of commercial banks, which together with outstanding cash makes up the monetary base (known also as M0). In March 2020, however, the Fed reduced reserve requirement ratios to zero, effectively abandoning this instrument and relying instead on interest rates on reserves to influence commercial banks' behavior.

Broad money includes money held in deposit balances in banks and other forms created in the financial system. Basic economics also teaches that the money supply shrinks when loans are repaid; however, the money supply will not necessarily decrease depending on the creation of new loans and other effects. Other than loans, investment activities of commercial banks and the Federal Reserve also increase and decrease the money supply. Discussion of "money" often confuses the different measures and may lead to misguided commentary on monetary policy and misunderstandings of policy discussions.

== Structure of modern US institutions ==
The Fed is largely concerned with policies related to the issuance of loans (including reserve rate and interest rates), along with other policies that determine the size and rate of growth of the money supply (such as buying and selling government bonds), whereas the Treasury deals directly with minting and printing as well as budgeting the government.

=== Federal Reserve ===
Monetary policy in the US is determined and implemented by the US Federal Reserve System, commonly referred to as the Federal Reserve. Established in 1913 by the Federal Reserve Act to provide central banking functions, the Federal Reserve System is a quasi-public institution. Ostensibly, the Federal Reserve Banks are 12 private banking corporations; they are independent in their day-to-day operations, but legislatively accountable to Congress through the auspices of Federal Reserve Board of Governors.

The Board of Governors is an independent governmental agency consisting of seven officials and their support staff of over 1800 employees headquartered in Washington, D.C. It is independent in the sense that the Board currently operates without official obligation to accept the requests or advice of any elected official with regard to actions on the money supply, and its methods of funding also preserve independence. The Governors are nominated by the President of the United States, and nominations must be confirmed by the U.S. Senate. There is very strong economic consensus that independence from political influence is good for monetary policy.

The Federal Open Market Committee (FOMC) is composed of the Federal Reserve Board of Governors and 5 out of the 12 Federal Reserve Bank presidents; the monetary policy is implemented by all twelve regional Federal Reserve Banks. The presidents of the Federal Reserve Banks are nominated by each bank's respective Board of Directors, but must also be approved by the Board of Governors of the Federal Reserve. The Chairman of the Federal Reserve Board is generally considered to have the most important position, followed by the president of the Federal Reserve Bank of New York. The Federal Reserve System is primarily funded by interest collected on their portfolio of securities from the US Treasury, and the Fed has broad discretion in drafting its own budget, but, historically, nearly all the interest the Federal Reserve collects is rebated to the government each year.

The Federal Reserve's present-day dual mandate monetary policy objectives to keep prices stable and unemployment low has replaced past practices under a gold standard where the main concern was the gold equivalent of the local currency, or under a gold exchange standard where the concern is fixing the exchange rate versus another gold-convertible currency (previously practiced worldwide under the Bretton Woods Agreement of 1944 via fixed exchange rates to the U.S. dollar).

The Fed operationalizes its goal of a stable price level as a 2% annual inflation target. In August 2020, after undershooting its 2% inflation target for years, the Fed announced it would be allowing inflation to temporarily rise higher, in order to target an average of 2% over the longer term.

=== U.S. Treasury ===
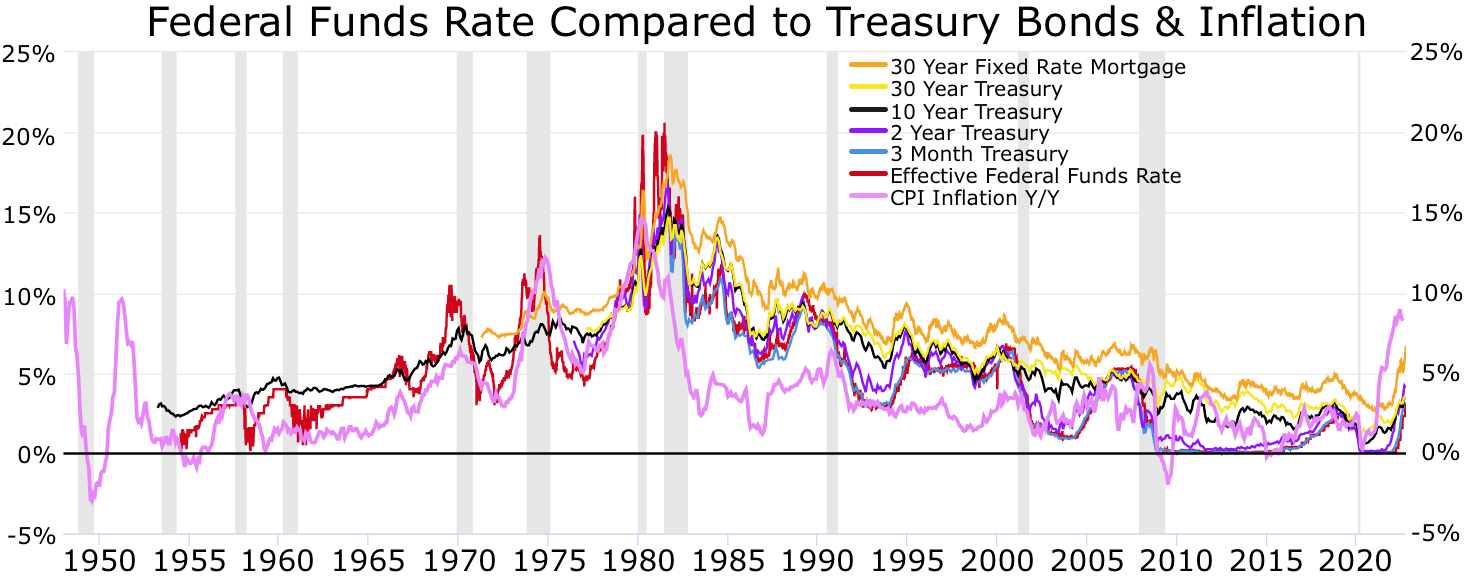
30 year mortgage average 30 Year Treasury Bond 10 Year Treasury Bond 2 Year Treasury Bond 3 month Treasury Bond Effective Federal Funds Rate CPI inflation year/year Recessions

The Treasury is the ultimate agency on fiscal policy and is responsible for printing & minting federal reserve notes and treasurys. A United States Treasury security is an IOU from the US Government. It is a government debt instrument issued by the United States Department of the Treasury to finance government spending as an alternative to taxation. Treasury securities are often referred to simply as "Treasuries". Since 2012 the management of government debt has been arranged by the Bureau of the Fiscal Service, succeeding the Bureau of the Public Debt.

=== Private commercial banks ===
When money is deposited in a bank, it can then be lent out to another person. If the initial deposit was $100 and the bank lends out $100 to another customer the money supply has increased by $100. However, because the depositor can ask for the money back, banks have to maintain minimum reserves to service customer needs. If the reserve requirement is 10% then, in the earlier example, the bank can lend $90 and thus the money supply increases by only $90. The reserve requirement therefore acts as a limit on this multiplier effect. Because the reserve requirement only applies to the more narrow forms of money creation (corresponding to M1), but does not apply to certain types of deposits (such as time deposits), reserve requirements play a limited role in monetary policy.

== Money creation ==
As of May 2026, the US government maintains over US$2460.1 billion in cash money (primarily Federal Reserve Notes) in circulation throughout the world, up from a sum of less than $30 billion in 1959. Below is an outline of the process which is currently used to control the amount of money in the economy. The amount of money in circulation generally increases to accommodate money demanded by the growth of the country's production. The process of money creation usually goes as follows:

1. Banks go through their daily transactions. Of the total money deposited at banks, significant and predictable proportions often remain deposited, and may be referred to as "core deposits". Banks use the bulk of "non-moving" money (their stable or "core" deposit base) by loaning it out. Banks have a legal obligation to keep a certain fraction of bank deposit money on-hand at all times.
2. In order to raise additional money to cover excess spending, Congress increases the size of the National Debt by issuing securities typically in the form of a Treasury Bond (see United States Treasury security). It offers the Treasury security for sale, and someone pays cash to the government in exchange. Banks are often the purchasers of these securities, and these securities currently play a crucial role in the process.
3. The 12-person Federal Open Market Committee, which consists of the heads of the Federal Reserve System (the seven Federal governors and five bank presidents), meets eight times a year to determine how they would like to influence the economy. They create a plan called the country's "monetary policy" which sets targets for things such as interest rates.
4. Every business day, the Federal Reserve System engages in Open market operations. If the Federal Reserve wants to increase the money supply, it will buy securities (such as U.S. Treasury Bonds) anonymously from banks in exchange for dollars. If the Federal Reserve wants to decrease the money supply, it will sell securities to the banks in exchange for dollars, taking those dollars out of circulation. When the Federal Reserve makes a purchase, it credits the seller's reserve account (with the Federal Reserve). The money that it deposits into the seller's account is not transferred from any existing funds, therefore it is at this point that the Federal Reserve has created High-powered money.
5. By means of open market operations, the Federal Reserve affects the free reserves of commercial banks in the country. Anna Schwartz explains that "if the Federal Reserve increases reserves, a single bank can make loans up to the amount of its excess reserves, creating an equal amount of deposits".
6. Since banks have more free reserves, they may loan out the money, because holding the money would amount to accepting the cost of foregone interest. When a loan is granted, a person is generally granted the money by adding to the balance on their bank account.
7. This is how the Federal Reserve's high-powered money is multiplied into a larger amount of broad money, through bank loans; as written in a particular case study, "as banks increase or decrease loans, the nation's (broad) money supply increases or decreases." Once granted these additional funds, the recipient has the option to withdraw physical currency (dollar bills and coins) from the bank, which will reduce the amount of money available for further on-lending (and money creation) in the banking system.
8. In many cases, account-holders will request cash withdrawals, so banks must keep a supply of cash handy. When they believe they need more cash than they have on hand, banks can make requests for cash with the Federal Reserve. In turn, the Federal Reserve examines these requests and places an order for printed money with the US Treasury Department. The Treasury Department sends these requests to the Bureau of Engraving and Printing (to make dollar bills) and the Bureau of the Mint (to stamp the coins).
9. The U.S. Treasury sells this newly printed money to the Federal Reserve for the cost of printing. This is about 6 cents per bill for any denomination. Aside from printing costs, the Federal Reserve must pledge collateral (typically government securities such as Treasury bonds) to put new money, which does not replace old notes, into circulation. This printed cash can then be distributed to banks, as needed.

Though the Federal Reserve authorizes and distributes the currency printed by the Treasury (the primary component of the narrow monetary base), the broad money supply is primarily created by commercial banks through the money multiplier mechanism. One textbook summarizes the process as follows:

"The Fed" controls the money supply in the United States by controlling the amount of loans made by commercial banks. New loans are usually in the form of increased checking account balances, and since checkable deposits are part of the money supply, the money supply increases when new loans are made ...

This type of money is convertible into cash when depositors request cash withdrawals, which will require banks to limit or reduce their lending. The vast majority of the broad money supply throughout the world represents current outstanding loans of banks to various debtors. A very small amount of U.S. currency still exists as "United States Notes", which have no meaningful economic difference from Federal Reserve notes in their usage, although they departed significantly in their method of issuance into circulation. The currency distributed by the Federal Reserve has been given the official designation of "Federal Reserve Notes".

== Uncertainties ==
A few of the uncertainties involved in monetary policy decision making are described by the federal reserve:

- While these policy choices seem reasonably straightforward, monetary policy makers routinely face certain notable uncertainties. First, the actual position of the economy and growth in aggregate demand at any time are only partially known, as key information on spending, production, and prices becomes available only with a lag. Therefore, policy makers must rely on estimates of these economic variables when assessing the appropriate course of policy, aware that they could act on the basis of misleading information. Second, exactly how a given adjustment in the federal funds rate will affect growth in aggregate demand—in terms of both the overall magnitude and the timing of its impact—is never certain. Economic models can provide rules of thumb for how the economy will respond, but these rules of thumb are subject to statistical error. Third, the growth in aggregate supply, often called the growth in potential output, cannot be measured with certainty.
- In practice, as previously noted, monetary policy makers do not have up-to-the-minute information on the state of the economy and prices. Useful information is limited not only by lags in the collection and availability of key data but also by later revisions, which can alter the picture considerably. Therefore, although monetary policy makers will eventually be able to offset the effects that adverse demand shocks have on the economy, it will be some time before the shock is fully recognized and—given the lag between a policy action and the effect of the action on aggregate demand—an even longer time before it is countered. Add to this the uncertainty about how the economy will respond to an easing or tightening of policy of a given magnitude, and it is not hard to see how the economy and prices can depart from a desired path for a period of time.
- The statutory goals of maximum employment and stable prices are easier to achieve if the public understands those goals and believes that the Federal Reserve will take effective measures to achieve them.
- Although the goals of monetary policy are clearly spelled out in law, the means to achieve those goals are not. Changes in the FOMC's target federal funds rate take some time to affect the economy and prices, and it is often far from obvious whether a selected level of the federal funds rate will achieve those goals.

== Opinions of the Federal Reserve ==
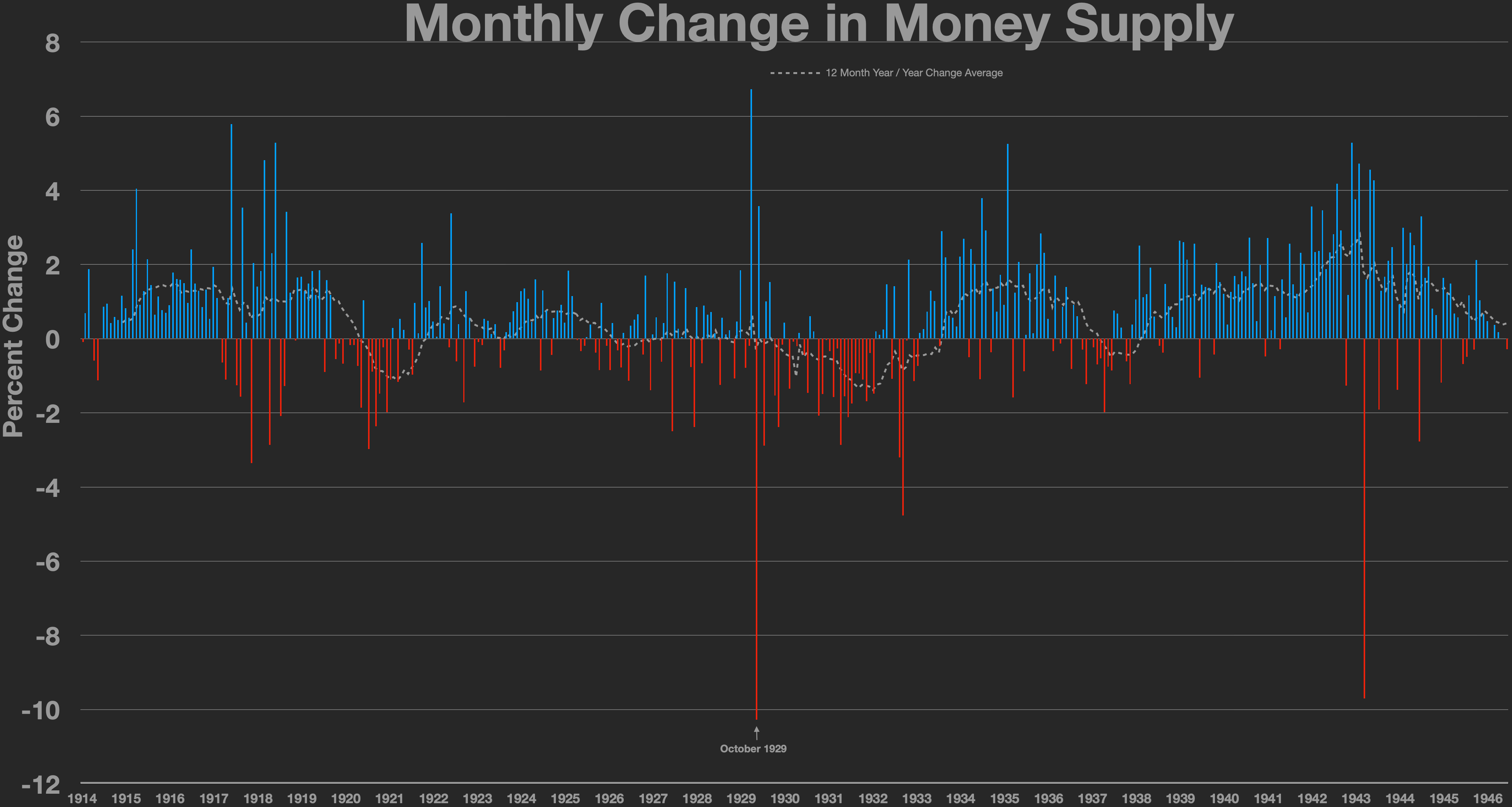
Total money supply contracted -10.28% in October 1929 when Roy A. Young was Chairman of the Federal Reserve and continued to contract for the next few years during the Great Depression and Herbert Hoover's presidency

The Federal Reserve is lauded by some economists, while being the target of scathing criticism by other economists, legislators, and sometimes members of the general public. The former Chairman of the Federal Reserve Board, Ben Bernanke, is one of the leading academic critics of the Federal Reserve's policies during the Great Depression.

=== Achievements ===
One of the functions of a central bank is to facilitate the transfer of funds through the economy, and the Federal Reserve System is largely responsible for the efficiency in the banking sector. There have also been specific instances which put the Federal Reserve in the spotlight of public attention. For instance, after the stock market crash in 1987, the actions of the Fed are generally believed to have aided in recovery. Also, the Federal Reserve is credited for easing tensions in the business sector with the reassurances given following the 9/11 terrorist attacks on the United States.

=== Criticisms ===
The Federal Reserve has been the target of various criticisms, involving: accountability, effectiveness, opacity, inadequate banking regulation, and potential market distortion. Federal Reserve policy has also been criticized for directly and indirectly benefiting large banks instead of consumers. For example, regarding the Federal Reserve's response to the 2008 financial crisis, Nobel laureate Joseph Stiglitz explained how the U.S. Federal Reserve was implementing another monetary policy—creating currency—as a method to combat the liquidity trap.

By creating $600 billion and inserting this directly into banks the Federal Reserve intended to spur banks to finance more domestic loans and refinance mortgages. However, banks instead were spending the money in more profitable areas by investing internationally in emerging markets. Banks were also investing in foreign currencies which Stiglitz and others point out may lead to currency wars while China redirects its currency holdings away from the United States.

==== Auditing ====
The Federal Reserve is subject to different requirements for transparency and audits than other government agencies, which its supporters claim is another element of the Fed's independence. Although the Federal Reserve has been required by law to publish independently audited financial statements since 1999, the Federal Reserve is not audited in the same way as other government agencies. Some confusion can arise because there are many types of audits, including: investigative or fraud audits; and financial audits, which are audits of accounting statements; there are also compliance, operational, and information system audits.

The Federal Reserve's annual financial statements are audited by an outside auditor. Similar to other government agencies, the Federal Reserve maintains an Office of the Inspector General, whose mandate includes conducting and supervising "independent and objective audits, investigations, inspections, evaluations, and other reviews of Board programs and operations". The Inspector General's audits and reviews are available on the Federal Reserve's website.

The Government Accountability Office (GAO) has the power to conduct audits, subject to certain areas of operations that are excluded from GAO audits; other areas may be audited at specific Congressional request, and have included bank supervision, government securities activities, and payment system activities. The GAO is specifically restricted any authority over monetary policy transactions; the New York Times reported in 1989 that "such transactions are now shielded from outside audit, although the Fed influences interest rates through the purchase of hundreds of billions of dollars in Treasury securities." As mentioned above, it was in 1999 that the law governing the Federal Reserve was amended to formalize the already-existing annual practice of ordering independent audits of financial statements for the Federal Reserve Banks and the Board; the GAO's restrictions on auditing monetary policy continued, however.

Congressional oversight on monetary policy operations, foreign transactions, and the FOMC operations is exercised through the requirement for reports and through semi-annual monetary policy hearings. Scholars have conceded that the hearings did not prove an effective means of increasing oversight of the Federal Reserve, perhaps because "Congresspersons prefer to bash an autonomous and secretive Fed for economic misfortune rather than to share the responsibility for that misfortune with a fully accountable Central Bank", although the Federal Reserve has also consistently lobbied to maintain its independence and freedom of operation.

==== Fulfillment of wider economic goals ====
By law, the goals of the Fed's monetary policy are: high employment, sustainable growth, and stable prices.

Critics say that monetary policy in the United States has not achieved consistent success in meeting the goals that have been delegated to the Federal Reserve System by Congress. Congress began to review more options with regard to macroeconomic influence beginning in 1946 (after World War II), with the Federal Reserve receiving specific mandates in 1977 (after the country suffered a period of stagflation).

Throughout the period of the Federal Reserve following the mandates, the relative weight given to each of these goals has changed, depending on political developments. In particular, the theories of Keynesianism and monetarism have had great influence on both the theory and implementation of monetary policy, and the "prevailing wisdom" or consensus view of the economic and financial communities has changed over the years.

- Elastic currency (magnitude of the money multiplier): the success of monetary policy is dependent on the ability to strongly influence the supply of money available to the citizens. If a currency is highly "elastic" (that is, has a higher money multiplier, corresponding to a tendency of the financial system to create more broad money for a given quantity of base money), plans to expand the money supply and accommodate growth are easier to implement. Low elasticity was one of many factors that contributed to the depth of the Great Depression: as banks cut lending, the money multiplier fell, and at the same time the Federal Reserve constricted the monetary base. The depression of the late 1920s is generally regarded as being the worst in the country's history, and the Federal Reserve has been criticized for monetary policy which worsened the depression. Partly to alleviate problems related to the depression, the United States transitioned from a gold standard and now uses a fiat currency; elasticity is believed to have been increased greatly.
- High employment – Unemployment has experienced significant increases on occasion, despite the efforts of the Federal Reserve. These periods include the early 1990s recession caused by the savings and loan crisis, the bursting of the dot-com bubble and the 2006 bursting of the housing bubble and the subprime mortgage crisis. In some cases, the Federal Reserve intentionally sacrificed employment levels in order to rein in spiralling inflation, as was the case for the Early 1980s recession, which was induced to alleviate a stagflation problem.

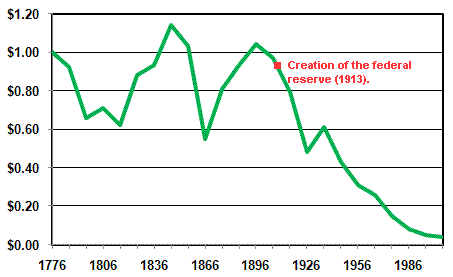
The value of $1 over time, in 1776 dollars.

- Stable prices – While some economists would regard any consistent inflation as a sign of unstable prices, policymakers could be satisfied with 1 or 2%; the consensus of "price stability" constituting long-run inflation of 1–2% is, however, a relatively recent development, and a change that has occurred at other central banks throughout the world. Inflation has averaged a 4.2% increase annually following the mandates applied in 1977; historic inflation since the establishment of the Federal Reserve in 1913 has averaged 3.4%. In contrast, some research indicates that average inflation for the 250 years before the system was near zero percent, though there were likely sharper upward and downward spikes in that timeframe as compared with more recent times. Central banks in some other countries, notably the German Bundesbank, had considerably better records of achieving price stability drawing on experience from the two episodes of hyperinflation and economic collapse under the country's previous central bank.

Inflation worldwide has fallen significantly since former Federal Reserve Chairman Paul Volcker began his tenure in 1979, a period which has been called the Great Moderation; some commentators attribute this to improved monetary policy worldwide, particularly in the Organisation for Economic Co-operation and Development. BusinessWeek notes that inflation has been relatively low since mid-1980s and it was during this time that Volcker wrote (in 1995), "It is a sobering fact that the prominence of central banks [such as the Federal Reserve] in this century has coincided with a general tendency towards more inflation, not less. By and large, if the overriding objective is price stability, we did better with the nineteenth-century gold standard and passive central banks, with currency boards, or even with 'free banking.'."

- Sustainable growth – The growth of the economy may not be sustainable as the ability for households to save money has been on an overall decline and household debt is consistently rising.

==== Causes of The Great Depression ====
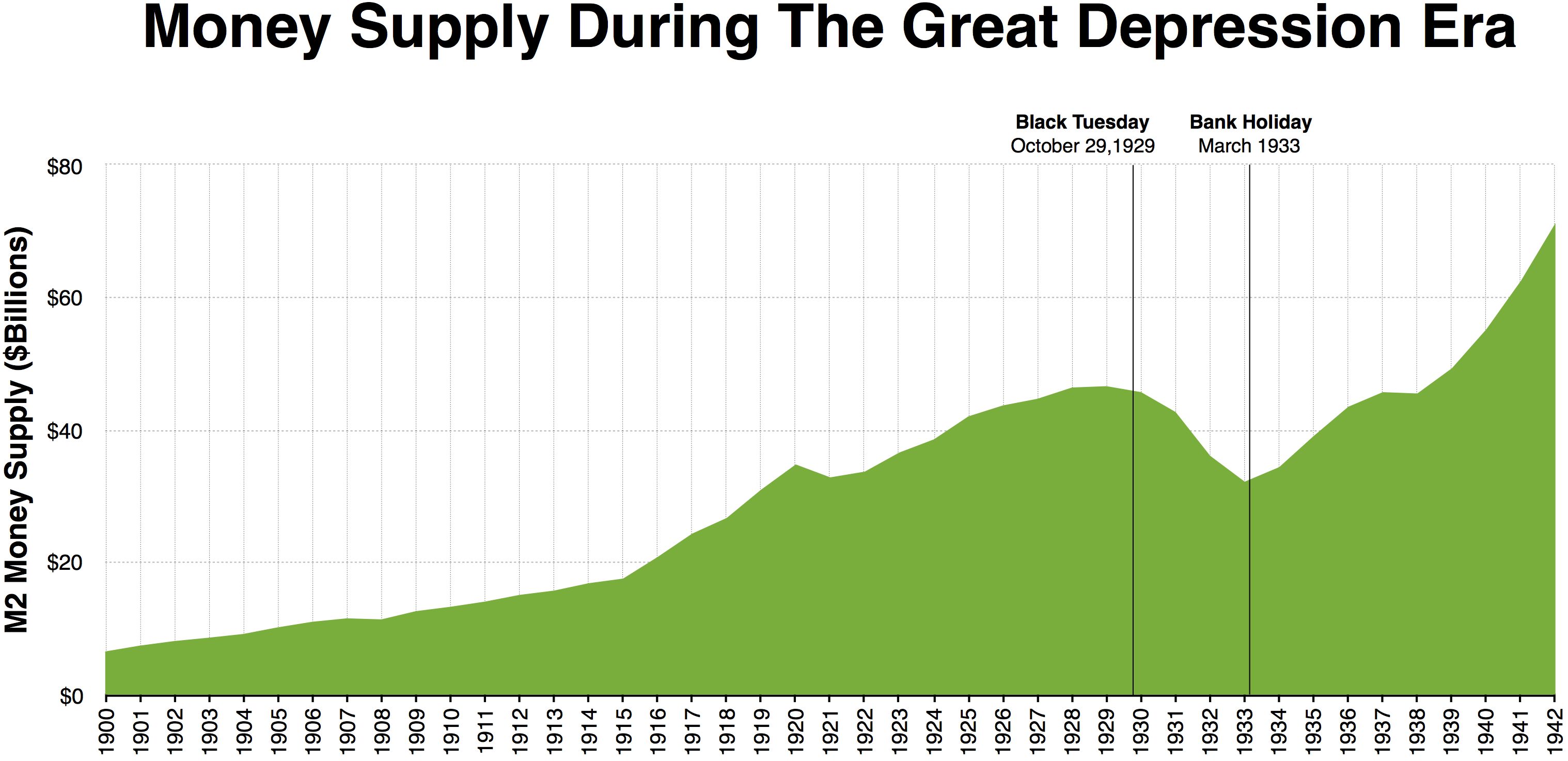
Money supply decreased significantly between Black Tuesday and the Bank Holiday in March 1933 when there were massive bank runs

Monetarists believe that the Great Depression started as an ordinary recession, but that significant policy mistakes by monetary authorities (especially the Federal Reserve) caused a shrinking of the money supply, which greatly exacerbated the economic situation, causing a recession to descend into the Great Depression.

==== Public confusion ====
The concepts involved in monetary policy may be widely misunderstood in the general public, as evidenced by the volume of literature on topics such as "Federal Reserve conspiracy" and "Federal Reserve fraud".

The Federal Reserve has established a library of information on their websites, however, many experts have spoken about the general level of public confusion that still exists on the subject of the economy; this lack of understanding of macroeconomic questions and monetary policy, however, exists in other countries as well. Critics of the Fed widely regard the system as being "opaque", and one of the Fed's most vehement opponents of his time, Congressman Louis T. McFadden, even went so far as to say that "Every effort has been made by the Federal Reserve Board to conceal its powers. ... "

There are, on the other hand, many economists who support the need for an independent central banking authority, and some have established websites that aim to clear up confusion about the economy and the Federal Reserve's operations. The Federal Reserve website itself publishes various information and instructional materials for a variety of audiences.

==== Criticism of government interference ====
Some economists, especially those belonging to the heterodox Austrian School, criticize the idea of even establishing monetary policy, believing that it distorts investment. Friedrich Hayek won the Nobel Prize for his elaboration of the Austrian business cycle theory.

Briefly, the theory holds that an artificial injection of credit, from a source such as a central bank like the Federal Reserve, sends false signals to entrepreneurs to engage in long-term investments due to a favorably low interest rate. However, the surge of investments undertaken represents an artificial boom, or bubble, because the low interest rate was achieved by an artificial expansion of the money supply and not by savings. Hence, the pool of real savings and resources have not increased and do not justify the investments undertaken.

These investments, which are more appropriately called "malinvestments", are realized to be unsustainable when the artificial credit spigot is shut off and interest rates rise. The malinvestments and unsustainable projects are liquidated, which is the recession. The theory demonstrates that the problem is the artificial boom which causes the malinvestments in the first place, made possible by an artificial injection of credit not from savings.

According to Austrian economics, without government intervention, interest rates will always be an equilibrium between the time-preferences of borrowers and savers, and this equilibrium is simply distorted by government intervention. This distortion, in their view, is the cause of the business cycle. Some Austrian economists—but by no means all—also support full reserve banking, a hypothetical financial/banking system where banks may not lend deposits. Others may advocate free banking, whereby the government abstains from any interference in what individuals may choose to use as money or the extent to which banks create money through the deposit and lending cycle.

==== Reserve requirement ====
The Federal Reserve regulates banking, and one regulation under its direct control is the reserve requirement which dictates how much money banks must keep in reserves, as compared to its demand deposits. Banks use their observation that the majority of deposits are not requested by the account holders at the same time.

Until March 2020 the Federal Reserve required that banks keep 10% of their deposits on hand, but in March 2020 the reserve requirement was reduced to zero. Some countries have no nationally mandated reserve requirements—banks use their own resources to determine what to hold in reserve, however their lending is typically constrained by other regulations. Other factors being equal, lower reserve percentages increases the possibility of Bank runs, such as the widespread runs of 1931. Low reserve requirements also allow for larger expansions of the money supply by actions of commercial banks—currently the private banking system has created much of the broad money supply of US dollars through lending activity.

Monetary policy reform calling for 100% reserves has been advocated by economists such as: Irving Fisher, Frank Knight, many ecological economists along with economists of the Chicago School and Austrian School. Despite calls for reform, the nearly universal practice of fractional-reserve banking has remained in the United States.

==== Monetary policy and debt ====
In 2005, the Federal Reserve held approximately 9% of the national debt as assets against the liability of printed money. In previous periods, the Federal Reserve has used other debt instruments, such as debt securities issued by private corporations. During periods when the national debt of the United States has declined significantly (such as happened in fiscal years 1999 and 2000), monetary policy and financial markets experts have studied the practical implications of having "too little" government debt: both the Federal Reserve and financial markets use the price information, yield curve and the so-called risk free rate extensively.

Experts are hopeful that other assets could take the place of National Debt as the base asset to back Federal Reserve notes, and Alan Greenspan, long the head of the Federal Reserve, has been quoted as saying, "I am confident that U.S. financial markets, which are the most innovative and efficient in the world, can readily adapt to a paydown of Treasury debt by creating private alternatives with many of the attributes that market participants value in Treasury securities." In principle, the government could still issue debt securities in significant quantities while having no net debt, and significant quantities of government debt securities are also held by other government agencies.

Although the U.S. government receives income overall from seigniorage, there are costs associated with maintaining the money supply. Leading ecological economist and steady-state theorist Herman Daly, claims that "over 95% of our [broad] money supply [in the United States] is created by the private banking system (demand deposits) and bears interest as a condition of its existence", a conclusion drawn from the Federal Reserve's ultimate dependence on increased activity in fractional reserve lending when it exercises open market operations. Economist Eric Miller criticizes Daly's logic because money is created in the banking system in response to demand for the money.

Thus, use of expansionary open market operations typically generates more debt in the private sector of society (in the form of additional bank deposits). The private banking system charges interest to borrowers as a cost to borrow the money. The interest costs are borne by those that have borrowed, and without this borrowing, open market operations would be unsuccessful in maintaining the broad money supply, though alternative implementations of monetary policy could be used. Depositors of funds in the banking system are paid interest on their savings (or provided other services, such as checking account privileges or physical security for their "cash"), as compensation for "lending" their funds to the bank.

Increases (or contractions) of the money supply corresponds to growth (or contraction) in interest-bearing debt in the country.

==== Criticism of private sector involvement ====
Historically and to the present day, various social and political movements (such as social credit) have criticized the involvement of the private sector in "creating money", claiming that only the government should have the power to "make money". Some proponents also support full reserve banking or other non-orthodox approaches to monetary policy. Various terminology may be used, including "debt money", which may have emotive or political connotations. The consensus changed after the 2008 financial crisis when a number of mainstream economists embraced that banks create money when they make loans.

== See also ==
- History of monetary policy in the United States
- Free banking
- Modern Monetary Theory
- Monetary sovereignty
- Treasury bills
- 2023 United States banking crisis
