= Pushing on a string =

Figure of speech

Pushing on a string is a figure of speech for influence that is more effective in moving things in one direction than another – one can pull, but not push.

If something is connected to someone by a string, they can move it toward themselves by pulling on the string, but they cannot move it away from themselves by pushing on the string. It is often used in the context of economic policy, specifically the view that "Monetary policy [is] asymmetric; it being easier to stop an expansion than to end a severe contraction."

== History ==
According to Roger G. Sandilans and John Harold Wood the phrase was introduced by Congressman T. Alan Goldsborough in 1935, supporting Federal Reserve chairman Marriner Eccles in Congressional hearings on the Banking Act of 1935:

Governor Eccles: Under present circumstances, there is very little, if any, that can be done.

Congressman Goldsborough: You mean you cannot push on a string.

Governor Eccles: That is a very good way to put it, one cannot push on a string. We are in the depths of a depression and... beyond creating an easy money situation through reduction of discount rates, there is very little, if anything, that the reserve organization can do to bring about recovery.

The phrase is, however, often attributed to John Maynard Keynes: "As Keynes pointed out, it's like pushing on a string...", "This is what Keynes meant by the phrase 'Pushing on a string.'"

The phrase is also used in regard to asymmetrical influence in other contexts; for example, in 1976 a labor statistician, writing in The New York Times about then US President elect Jimmy Carter's policies, wrote that

in today's economy, reducing unemployment by stimulating employment has become more and more like pushing on a string.

=== Predecessors ===
The appearance of the phrase in a 1910 medical book suggests that it was proverbial at the time Goldsborough used it:

If the arm muscles have been thus taxed the arm drops as if paralyzed and can no more be forced to do work in chronic fatigue than we can push on a string.

== Monetary policy ==
"Pushing on a string" is particularly used to illustrate limitations of monetary policy, particularly that the money multiplier is an inequality, a limit on money creation, not an equality.

In modern economies with fractional-reserve banking, money creation follows a two-stage process. First, a central bank introduces new base money into the economy (termed 'expansionary monetary policy') by purchasing financial assets from or lending money to financial institutions. Second, the new money introduced by the central bank is multiplied by commercial banks through fractional reserve banking; this expands the amount of broad money (i.e. cash plus demand deposits) in the economy so that it is a multiple (known as the money multiplier) of the amount originally created by the central bank. Money is in essence pulled from central banks to commercial banks, and then to borrowers. This is the crux of the "pushing on a string" metaphor – that money cannot be pushed from the central bank to borrowers if they do not wish to borrow.

Alternatively, the process can be seen as borrowers demanding credit from commercial banks, who then borrow base money to provide reserves to back the new bank money: demand for credit pulls base money from central banks. This presentation is particularly associated with, and seen as support for, endogenous money theory, such as monetary circuit theory, in that money supply is not determined by an exogenous (external) force (central bank policy), but rather a combination of central bank policy and endogenous (internal) business reasons.

Commercial banks extend loans, and borrowers take out loans, for commercial reasons – because they expect to benefit from them: banks profit by charging interest on the loan higher than they must pay on their debts (the "spread"), while borrowers may for instance invest the money (hire workers, build a factory), speculate with it, or use it for consumption. These loans must in turn be backed by reserves – this is a legal requirement, otherwise banks could print unlimited quantities of money – and banks are allowed to extend as loans some multiple of reserves: in a fractional-reserve banking system banks are allowed to extend more loans than they have reserves (the ratio is called the money multiplier, and is greater than 1), while in a full-reserve banking loans must be precisely backed by reserves and the money multiplier is 1. The distinction between fractional-reserve and full-reserve is not significant in this context – the important point is that in both systems, loans must be backed by reserves.

Crucially, central banks can limit money creation by either limiting the amount of base money extended, thus denying reserves and preventing commercial banks from extending further loans, or by raising the price of base money extended by increasing interest rates and thus making loans less profitable for the bank (raising the hurdle rate), and while relaxing these constraints can encourage money creation, central banks cannot force commercial banks to extend credit – monetary policy can pull but not push.

By increasing the volume of their government securities and loans and by lowering Member Bank legal reserve requirements, the Reserve Banks can encourage an increase in the supply of money and bank deposits. They can encourage but, without taking drastic action, they cannot compel. For in the middle of a deep depression just when we want Reserve policy to be most effective, the Member Banks are likely to be timid about buying new investments or making loans. If the Reserve authorities buy government bonds in the open market and thereby swell bank reserves, the banks will not put these funds to work but will simply hold reserves. Result: no 5 for 1, "no nothing," simply a substitution on the bank's balance sheet of idle cash for old government bonds.

— (Samuelson 1948, pp. 353–54.)

If there is unmet demand for credit money, then credit money is pulling and monetary policy can be effective, by being more or less restrictive, just as if a dog or horse is pulling on a leash or bridle its speed can be regulated by reining it in or letting it loose – one says that the reserve requirement constraint is binding. If, conversely, all demand for credit money is being met, either because banks do not wish to lend (finding it too risky or unprofitable) or borrowers do not wish to borrow (having no use for added debt, such as due to lack of business opportunities), then the string is slack, the reserve constraint is not binding, and monetary policy is ineffective: monetary policy allows reining in a horse, but does not allow whipping it on.

The breakdown in monetary policy is particularly damaging because it often occurs in financial crises such as the Great Depression and the 2008 financial crisis: in the midst of a crisis, banks will be more cautious about lending money due to higher risk of default, and borrowers will be more cautious about borrowing money because of lack of investment and speculation opportunities: if demand is dropping, new investment is unlikely to be profitable, and if asset prices are dropping (following the bursting of a speculative bubble), speculation on rising asset prices is unlikely to prove profitable.

=== Excess reserves ===
Restated, increases in central bank money may not result in commercial bank money because the money is not required to be lent out – it may instead result in a growth of unlent reserves (excess reserves).

If banks maintain low levels of excess reserves, as they did in the US from 1959 to August 2008, then central banks can finely control broad (commercial bank) money supply by controlling central bank money creation, as the multiplier gives a direct and fixed connection between these.
