= Money multiplier =

Ratio of money supply to central bank money

In monetary economics, the money multiplier is the ratio of the money supply to the monetary base (i.e. central bank money). In some simplified expositions, the monetary multiplier is presented as simply the reciprocal of the reserve ratio, if any, required by the central bank. More generally, the multiplier will depend on the preferences of households, the legal regulation and the business policies of commercial banks – factors which the central bank can influence, but not control completely.

Because the money multiplier theory offers a potential explanation of the ways in which the central bank can control the total money supply, it is relevant when considering monetary policy strategies that target the money supply. Historically, some central banks have tried to conduct monetary policy by targeting the money supply and its growth rate, particularly in the 1970s and 1980s. The results were not considered satisfactory, however, and starting in the early 1990s, most central banks abandoned trying to steer money growth in favour of targeting inflation directly, using changes in interest rates as the main instrument to influence economic activity. As controlling the size of the money supply has ceased being an important goal for central bank policy generally, the money multiplier parallelly has become less relevant as a tool to understand current monetary policy. It is still often used in introductory economic textbooks, however, as a simple shorthand description of the connections between central bank policies and the money supply.

== Definition ==
The money multiplier is normally presented in the context of some simple accounting identities: Usually, the money supply (M) is defined as consisting of two components: (physical) currency (C) and deposit accounts (D) held by the general public. By definition, therefore:

$M = D+C.$

Additionally, the monetary base (B) (also known as high-powered money) is normally defined as the sum of currency held by the general public (C) and the reserves of the banking sector (held either as currency in the vaults of the commercial banks or as deposits at the central bank) (R):

$B = R+C.$

Rearranging these two definitions result in a third identity:

$M =\frac{1+C/D}{R/D + C/D}B.$

This relation describes the money supply in terms of the level of base money and two ratios: R/D is the ratio of commercial banks' reserves to deposit accounts, and C/D is the general public's ratio of currency to deposits. As the relation is an identity, it holds true by definition, so that a change in the money supply can always be expressed in terms of these three variables alone. This may be advantageous because it is a simple way of summarising money supply changes, but the use of the identity does not in itself provide a behavioural theory of what determines the money supply. If, however, one additionally assumes that the two ratios C/D and R/D are exogenously determined constants, the equation implies that the central bank can control the money supply by controlling the monetary base via open-market operations: In this case, when the monetary base increases by, say, $1, the money supply will increase by $(1+C/D)/(R/D + C/D). This is the central contents of the money multiplier theory, and

$\frac{1+C/D}{R/D + C/D}$

is the money multiplier, a multiplier being a factor that measures how much an endogenous variable (in this case, the money supply) changes in response to a change in some exogenous variable (in this case, the money base).

In some textbook applications, the relationship is simplified by assuming that cash does not exist so that the public holds money only in the form of bank deposits. In that case, the currency-deposit ratio C/D equals zero, and the money multiplier is

$\frac{1}{R/D}.$

Empirically, the money multiplier can be found as the ratio of some broad money aggregate like M2 over M0 (base money).

== Interpretation ==
Generally, the currency-deposit ratio C/D reflects the preferences of households about the form of money they wish to hold (currency versus deposits). The reserve-deposit ratio R/D will be determined by the business policies of commercial banks and the laws regulating banks. Benjamin Friedman in his chapter on the money supply in The New Palgrave Dictionary of Economics writes that both central bank reserves (supplied by the central bank and demanded by the commercial banks for several reasons) and deposits (supplied by commercial banks and demanded by households and non-financial firms) are traded in markets with equilibria of demand and supply which depend on the interest rate as well as a number of other factors. Consequently, the money multiplier representation should be interpreted as "really just a shorthand simplification that works well or badly depending on the strength of the relevant interest elasticities and the extent of variation in interest rates and the many other factors involved."

=== The importance of excess reserves ===
In some presentations of the money multiplier theory, the further simplification is made that commercial banks only hold the reserves that are legally required by the monetary authorities so that the R/D ratio is determined directly by the central banks. In many countries the monetary authorities maintain reserve requirements that secure a minimum level of reserves at all times. However, commercial banks may often hold excess reserves, i.e. reserves held in excess of the legal reserve requirements. This is for instance the case in countries that do not impose legal reserve requirements at all like the United States, the United Kingdom, Canada, Australia, New Zealand and the Scandinavian countries. The possibility of banks voluntarily choosing to hold excess reserves, in amounts that may change over time as the opportunity costs for banks change, are one reason why the monetary multiplier may not be stable. For instance, following the introduction of interest rates on excess reserves in the US, a large growth in excess reserves occurred in the 2008 financial crisis, US bank excess reserves growing over 500-fold, from under $2 billion in August 2008 to over $1,000 billion in November 2009.

The insight that banks may adjust their reserve/deposit ratio endogenously, making the money multiplier unstable, is old. Paul Samuelson noted in his bestselling textbook in 1948 that:

By increasing the volume of their government securities and loans and by lowering Member Bank legal reserve requirements, the Reserve Banks can encourage an increase in the supply of money and bank deposits. They can encourage but, without taking drastic action, they cannot compel. For in the middle of a deep depression just when we want Reserve policy to be most effective, the Member Banks are likely to be timid about buying new investments or making loans. If the Reserve authorities buy government bonds in the open market and thereby swell bank reserves, the banks will not put these funds to work but will simply hold reserves. Result: no 5 for 1, “no nothing,” simply a substitution on the bank’s balance sheet of idle cash for old government bonds.

— (Samuelson 1948, pp. 353–354)

Restated, increases in central bank money may not result in commercial bank money because the money is not required to be lent out – it may instead result in a growth of unlent (i.e. excess) reserves. This situation has been referred to as "pushing on a string": withdrawal of central bank money compels commercial banks to curtail lending (one can pull money via this mechanism), but input of central bank money does not compel commercial banks to lend (one cannot push via this mechanism).

The amount of its assets that a bank chooses to hold as excess reserves is a decreasing function of the amount by which the market rate for loans to the general public from commercial banks exceeds the interest rate on excess reserves and of the amount by which the market rate for loans to other banks (in the US, the federal funds rate) exceeds the interest rate on excess reserves. Since the money multiplier in turn depends negatively on the desired reserve/deposit ratio, the money multiplier depends positively on these two opportunity costs. Moreover, the public’s choice of the currency/deposit ratio depends negatively on market rates of return on highly liquid substitutes for currency; since the currency ratio negatively affects the money multiplier, the money multiplier is positively affected by the return on these substitutes. Note that when making predictions assuming a constant multiplier, the predictions are valid only if these ratios do not in fact change. Sometimes this holds, and sometimes it does not; for example, increases in central bank money (i.e. base money) may result in increases in commercial bank money – and will, if these ratios (and thus multiplier) stay constant – or may result in increases in excess reserves but little or no change in commercial bank money, in which case the reserve–deposit ratio will grow and the multiplier will fall.

=== "Loans first" model ===
An alternative interpretation of the direction of causality in the identity described above is that the connection between the money supply and the monetary base goes from the former to the latter: Interest-rate-targeting central banks supply whatever amount of reserves that the banking system demands, given the reserve requirements and the amount of deposits that have been created.

In this alternative model of money creation, loans are first extended by commercial banks – say, $1,000 of loans, which may then require that the bank borrow $100 of reserves either from depositors or other private sources of financing, or from the central bank. This view is advanced in endogenous money theories. It is also occasionally referred to as a "Loans first" model as opposed to the traditional multiplier theory, which can be labelled a "Reserves first" model.

== Monetary policy in practice ==
Whereas used in many textbooks, the realism of the money multiplier theory is questioned by several economists, and it is generally rejected as a useful description of actual central bank behaviour today, partly because major central banks generally have not tried to control the monetary supply during the last decades, hence making the theory irrelevant, partly because it is doubtful as to how large an extent the central banks would be able to control the money supply, should they wish to. The last question is a matter of the stability of the money multiplier.

=== Historical attempts to steer the money supply ===
Historically, central banks have in some periods used strategies of trying to target a certain level or growth rate of money supply, in particular during the late 1970s and 1980s, inspired by monetarist theory and the quantity theory of money. However, these strategies turned out to not work very well and were abandoned again. In the United States, short-term interest rates became fourfould more volatile during the years 1979-1982 when the Federal Reserve adopted a moderate version of monetary base control, and the targeted monetary aggregate at the time, M1, even increased its short-term volatility.

=== Current monetary policy ===
Starting in the early 1990s, a fundamental rethinking of monetary policy took place in major central banks, shifting to targeting inflation rather than monetary growth and generally using interest rates to implement goals rather than quantitative measures like holding the quantity of base money at fixed levels. As a result, modern central banks hardly ever conduct their policies by trying to control the money supply, implying also that the monetary multiplier theory has become more irrelevant as a tool to understand current monetary policy.

Charles Goodhart notes in his chapter on the monetary base in The New Palgrave that the banking system has virtually never worked in the way hypothesized by the monetary multiplier theory. Instead, central banks have used their powers to effect a desired level of interest rates rather than achieve a pre-determined quantity of monetary base or of some monetary aggregate. He also mentions that the institutional development of the financial markets, notably interbank lending markets, implies that the monetary base multiplier no longer would, or could, work in the textbook fashion. Instead, he argues that the behavioural process leading to a change in monetary bases runs from an initial change in interest rates to a subsequent readjustment in monetary aggregate quantities, endogenously determining these as well as the accommodating monetary base. Also David Romer notes in his graduate textbook "Advanced Macroeconomics" that it is difficult for central banks to control broad monetary aggregates like M2, causing central banks generally to assign the behaviour of the money supply an unimportant role in policy, focusing instead on adjusting nominal interest rates to stabilize the economy. Gregory Mankiw, author of one of the widely read intermediate textbooks (Macroeconomics) that present the money multiplier theory, notes in its 11th edition that even though the Federal Reserve can influence the money supply, it cannot control it fully because households' decisions and banks' discretion in the conduct of their business may change the money supply in ways unanticipated by the central bank.

After the 2008 financial crisis, several central banks, including the Federal Reserve, Bank of England, Deutsche Bundesbank, the Hungarian National Bank and Danmarks Nationalbank have issued explanations of money creation supporting the view that central banks generally do not control the creation of money, nor do they try to, though their interest rate-setting monetary policies naturally affect the amount of loans and deposits that commercial banks create. The Federal Reserve in 2021 launched several educational resources to facilitate teaching the conduct of current monetary policy, recommending teachers to avoid relying on the money multiplier concept, which was described as obsolete and unusable.

Jaromir Benes and Michael Kumhof of the IMF Research Department, argue that: the "deposit multiplier" of the undergraduate economics textbook, where monetary aggregates are created at the initiative of the central bank, through an initial injection of high-powered money into the banking system that gets multiplied through bank lending, turns the actual operation of the monetary transmission mechanism on its head. At all times, when banks ask for reserves, the central bank obliges. According to this model, reserves therefore impose no constraint and the deposit multiplier is therefore a myth. The authors therefore argue that private banks are almost fully in control of the money creation process.

Besides the mainstream questioning of the usefulness of the money multiplier theory, the rejection of this theory has also been a theme in the heterodox post-Keynesian school of economic thought.

== Example ==
As explained above, according to the monetary multiplier theory money creation in a fractional-reserve banking system occurs when a given reserve is lent out by a bank, then deposited at a bank (possibly different), which is then lent out again, the process repeating and the ultimate result being a geometric series.

The following formula for the money multiplier may be used, explicitly accounting for the fact that the public has a desire to hold some currency in the form of cash and that commercial banks may desire to hold reserves in excess of the legal reserve requirements:

$$m=\frac{(1+Currency/Deposit Ratio)}{(Currency/Deposit Ratio + Desired Reserve Ratio)}.$$

Here the Desired Reserve Ratio is the sum of the required reserve ratio and the excess reserve ratio.

The formula above is derived from the following procedure. Let the monetary base be normalized to unity. Define the legal reserve ratio, $\alpha \in\left(0, 1\right)\;$, the excess reserves ratio, $\beta \in\left(0, 1\right)\;$, the currency/deposit ratio with respect to deposits, $\gamma \in\left(0, 1\right)\;$; suppose the demand for funds is unlimited; then the theoretical superior limit for deposits is defined by the following series:

$Deposits = \sum_{n = 0}^{\infty}\left[\left(1 - \alpha - \beta - \gamma\right)\right]^{n} = \frac{1}{\alpha + \beta + \gamma}$

.

Analogously, the theoretical superior limit for the money held by public is defined by the following series:

$Publicly Held Currency = \gamma \cdot Deposits = \frac{\gamma}{\alpha + \beta + \gamma}$

and the theoretical superior limit for the total loans lent in the market is defined by the following series:

$Loans = \left(1 - \alpha - \beta\right) \cdot Deposits = \frac{1 - \alpha - \beta}{\alpha + \beta + \gamma}$

By summing up the two quantities, the theoretical money multiplier is defined as

$m = \frac{Money Stock}{Monetary Base} = \frac{Deposits + Publicly Held Currency}{Monetary Base} = \frac{1 + \gamma}{\alpha + \beta + \gamma}$

where α + β = Desired Reserve Ratio and $\gamma = currency/deposit$

The process described above by the geometric series can be represented in the following table, where

- loans at stage $k\;$ are a function of the deposits at the preceding stage: $L_{k} = \left(1 - \alpha - \beta\right) \cdot D_{k - 1}$
- publicly held money at stage $k\;$ is a function of the deposits at the preceding stage: $PHM_{k} = \gamma \cdot D_{k - 1}$
- deposits at stage $k\;$ are the difference between additional loans and publicly held money relative to the same stage: $D_{k} = L_{k} - PHM_{k}\;$

Process of money multiplication
n	Deposits	Loans	Publicly held money
$n = 0\;$	$D_{0} = 1\;$	-	-
$n = 1\;$	$D_{1} = \left(1 - \alpha - \beta - \gamma\right)$	$L_{1} = \left(1 - \alpha - \beta\right)$	$PHM_{1} = \gamma\;$
$n = 2\;$	$D_{2} = \left(1 - \alpha - \beta - \gamma\right)^2$	$L_{2} = \left(1 - \alpha - \beta\right) \left(1 - \alpha - \beta - \gamma\right)$	$PHM_{2} = \gamma \left(1 - \alpha - \beta - \gamma\right)$
$n = 3\;$	$D_{3} = \left(1 - \alpha - \beta - \gamma\right)^3$	$L_{3} = \left(1 - \alpha - \beta\right) \left(1 - \alpha - \beta - \gamma\right)^2$	$PHM_{3} = \gamma \left(1 - \alpha - \beta - \gamma\right)^2$
…	…	…	…
$n = k\;$	$D_{k} = \left(1 - \alpha - \beta - \gamma\right)^k$	$L_{k} = \left(1 - \alpha - \beta\right) \left(1 - \alpha - \beta - \gamma\right)^{k - 1}$	$PHM_{k} = \gamma \left(1 - \alpha - \beta - \gamma\right)^{k - 1}$
…	…	…	…
$n \rightarrow \infty$	$D_{\infty} = 0$	$L_{\infty} = 0$	$PHM_{\infty} = 0$
	Total deposits:	Total loans:	Total publicly held money:
	$D = \frac{1}{\alpha + \beta + \gamma}$	$L = \frac{1 - \alpha - \beta}{\alpha + \beta + \gamma}$	$PHM = \frac{\gamma}{\alpha + \beta + \gamma}$

=== Table ===
This re-lending process (assuming that no currency is used) can be depicted as follows, assuming a 20% reserve ratio and a $100 initial deposit:

Individual bank	Amount deposited	Lent out	Reserves
A	100.00	80.00	20.00
B	80.00	64.00	16.00
C	64.00	51.20	12.80
D	51.20	40.96	10.24
E	40.96	32.77	8.19
F	32.77	26.21	6.55
G	26.21	20.97	5.24
H	20.97	16.78	4.19
I	16.78	13.42	3.36
J	13.42	10.74	2.68
K	10.74		
			Total reserves:
			89.26
	Total amount of deposits:	Total amount lent out:	Total reserves + last amount deposited:
	457.05	357.05	100.00
Table sources:

Note that no matter how many times the smaller and smaller amounts of money are re-lent, the legal reserve requirement is never exceeded – because that would be illegal.

== See also ==
- Deficit spending
- Economic growth
- Economic value added
- Helicopter money
- Inflation targeting
- Malinvestment
- Quantitative tightening
- Return on capital

== Sources ==
- Blanchard, Olivier; Amighini, Alessia; Giavazzi, Francesco (2017). Macroeconomics: a European perspective (3rd ed.). Pearson. ISBN 978-1-292-08567-8.
- Krugman, Paul; Wells, Robin (2009), Macroeconomics, Macmillan, ISBN 978-0-7167-7161-6
- Mankiw, N. Gregory (2002), Macroeconomics (5th ed.), Worth Publishers, ISBN 978-0-7167-5237-0
- Mankiw, N. Gregory (2022), Macroeconomics (11th ed.), Worth Publishers, ISBN 978-1-319-26390-4
- Romer, David (2019). Advanced macroeconomics (Fifth ed.). New York, NY: McGraw-Hill. ISBN 978-1-260-18521-8.
- Samuelson, Paul (1948), Economics
