= Fiscal policy of the United States =

The United States Congress and U.S. President conduct fiscal policy on behalf of the American people.

The United States government uses fiscal policy to manage its federal budget and advance the American economy. It is primarily carried out through a combination of taxation and public spending. American fiscal policy is characterized by structural deficit spending, rising national debt, and the dominance of entitlement programs.

The American public called on the government to exert greater control over public finances after the 1930s Great Depression. This was formalized under President Franklin D. Roosevelt who instituted the New Deal across the country, ending the nation's historic laissez-faire economic planning. After World War II, fiscal policy became further aligned with monetary policy as well as economic policy. The 1970s and 1980s saw increased deficit spending amid broader stagflation. The federal budget was balanced from 1998 to 2001 under President Bill Clinton, as mandatory entitlement programs took up a larger share of public spending. Since the 2000s, fiscal policy has used stimulus spending to alleviate economic recessions, public health crises, and armed conflict.

== History ==
=== The Great Depression ===
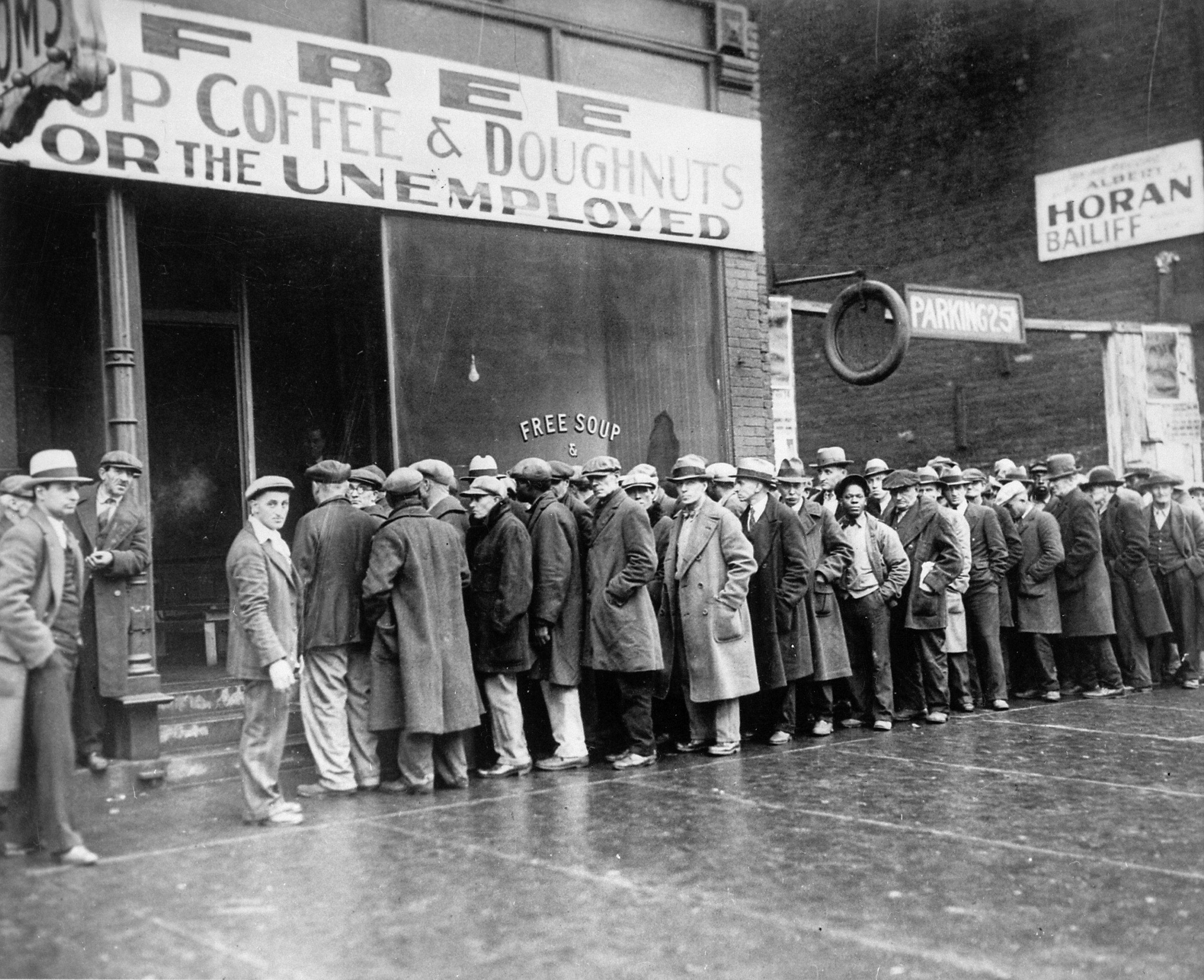
Americans during the Great Depression, 1931

The adverse economic impact of the Great Depression during the 1930s galvanized the American public. They called on the federal government to exert greater control over public finances. This was formalized under President Franklin D. Roosevelt who instituted the New Deal across the country, growing from 553,000 paid civilian employees in the late 1920s to 953,891 employees in 1939. During the 1930s, unemployment rates remained elevated before the U.S. converted into a war economy ahead of World War II.

=== World War II ===
During the war, the U.S. government ran large budget deficits to finance their large-scale war effort and revitalize the American economy. A year after the war concluded, the Employment Act of 1946 was passed to protect the country from a post-war economic depression. The act declared the continuing policy and responsibility of the federal government to use all reasonable means to promote maximum employment, production, and purchasing power.

== Modern fiscal policy ==
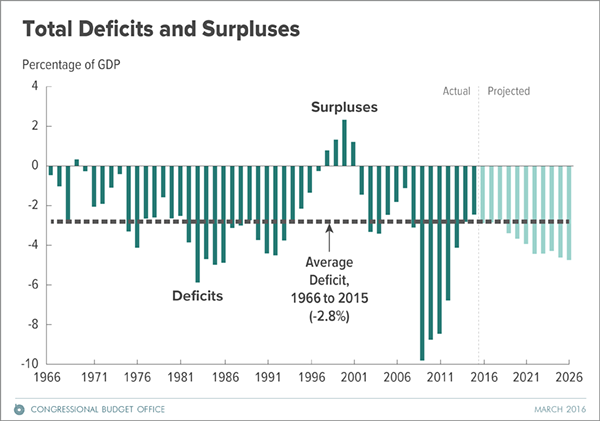
U.S. deficits and surpluses 1966-2026 by percentage of GDP

The federal government has run a structural budget deficit since 2002. The turn of the 21st century was marked by a significant increase in defense spending related to the September 11 attacks and the War on Terror. Major federal tax cuts during the 2000s curtailed revenue and led to a sharp increase in national debt.

In 2008, the U.S. experienced a severe financial crisis and a deep economic recession. In an attempt to fix these economic problems, the federal government passed a series of costly economic stimulus and bailout packages. Over subsequent years both the economy and the deficit recovered to some extent, and the government enacted several laws with significant budget impact, including the Affordable Care Act in 2010, the Budget Control Act in 2011, and the American Taxpayer Relief Act in 2012.

The COVID-19 pandemic in 2019 led to further large-scale fiscal stimulus while the One Big Beautiful Bill Act similarly expanded the federal budget deficit six years later in 2025.

== See also ==
- U.S. national debt
- Taxation in the United States
- Monetary policy of the United States
- Global macro trading
