= Demand deposit =

Funds held in demand deposit accounts

Demand deposits or checkbook money are funds held in demand accounts in commercial banks. These account balances are usually considered money and form the greater part of the narrowly defined money supply of a country. Simply put, these are deposits in the bank that can be withdrawn on demand, without any prior notice.

== History ==
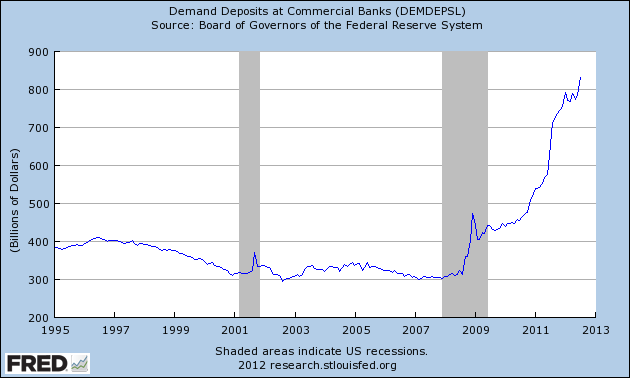
U.S. demand deposits at commercial banks, 1995–2012

In the United States, demand deposits arose following the 1865 tax of 10% on the issuance of state bank notes; see history of banking in the U.S.

In the U.S., demand deposits only refer to funds held in checking accounts (or cheque offering accounts) other than NOW accounts; however, in a 1970s and 1980s response to the 1933 promulgation of Regulation Q in the U.S., demand deposits in some cases came to allow easier access to funds from other types of accounts (e.g. savings accounts and money market accounts). For the historical basis of the distinction between demand deposits and NOW accounts in the U.S., see Negotiable order of withdrawal account.

== Money supply ==
Demand deposits are usually considered part of the narrowly defined money supply, as they can be used, via checks and drafts, as a means of payment for goods and services and to settle debts. The money supply of a country is usually defined to consist of currency plus demand deposits. In most countries, demand deposits account for a majority of the money supply. The majority of demand deposits arise from bank lending.

=== Fractional-reserve banking ===
Demand deposits are fundamental to the fractional-reserve banking system. Banks only back a fraction of demand deposits with reserves. Textbooks had explained money creation using money multiplier and reserve requirements concepts. Michael Kumhof and Richard Werner have shown banks create money out of thin air.

=== Economic crises ===
==== Great Depression ====
During the Great Depression, widespread bank runs led to massive withdrawals of demand deposits.

Conversion of demand deposits to currency caused:

- Severe contraction in the money supply (M1 fell by 27%)
- Bank failures due to insufficient reserves
- Deflationary pressure on the economy

The experience of bank panics led to the creation of the Federal Deposit Insurance Corporation in 1933, insuring limited deposit amounts and restoring public confidence in banks.

==== 2008 financial crisis ====
However, during the 2008 financial crisis, demand deposits in the U.S. increased dramatically, from around $310 billion in August 2008 to a peak of around $460 billion in December 2008. This increase reflected:

- Flight to quality: Investors moved funds from risky investments to insured bank deposits
- Liquidity hoarding: Businesses and individuals increased cash holdings due to economic uncertainty
- Credit market disruption: Reduced availability of alternative short-term investments

=== Modern banking stability ===
Contemporary demand deposit systems use multiple stabilizing mechanisms:

- Deposit insurance: FDIC insurance (currently $250,000 per account) prevents most bank runs
- Federal Reserve support: Lender of last resort function provides emergency liquidity
- Capital requirements: Banks must maintain minimum capital ratios to absorb losses
- Stress testing: Regular evaluation of banks' ability to withstand economic shocks

=== International variations ===
==== European Union ====
European demand deposits operate under the Single Euro Payments Area (SEPA) framework, allowing transfers across member countries. The European Central Bank supervises major banks and sets monetary policy affecting demand deposit rates.

==== United Kingdom ====
UK demand deposits, called current accounts, typically offer more services than US checking accounts, including:

- Automatic bill payment services (direct debits)
- Overdraft facilities
- Mobile banking platforms

==== Developing economies ====
Many developing countries have lower demand deposit ratios due to:

- Higher cash usage in daily transactions
- Limited banking infrastructure
- Lower levels of financial inclusion
- Greater reliance on informal financial systems

== Monetary reform and policy implications ==
=== Contemporary reform proposals ===
==== Full-reserve banking ====
Some economists advocate for 100% reserve banking, requiring banks to hold complete reserves against demand deposits. Proponents argue this would:

- Eliminate fractional reserve banking risks
- Prevent bank runs and financial instability
- Give central banks direct control over money supply
- Separate monetary policy from credit allocation

Critics contend that full reserves would:

- Dramatically reduce credit availability
- Increase borrowing costs
- Require fundamental restructuring of the financial system

== See also ==
- Liquidity
