= Bank reserves =

Commercial banks' holdings deposited in central banks

Bank reserves are a commercial bank's cash holdings physically held by the bank, and deposits held in the bank's account with the central bank. In most countries, the central bank may set minimum reserve requirements that mandate commercial banks under their purview to hold cash or deposits at the central bank equivalent to at least a prescribed percentage of their liabilities, such as customer deposits. Such sums are usually termed required reserves, and any funds above the required amount are called excess reserves. These reserves are prescribed to ensure that, in the normal events, there is sufficient liquidity in the banking system to provide funds to bank customers wishing to withdraw cash. Even when there are no reserve requirements, banks often as a matter of prudent management hold reserves in case of unexpected events, such as unusually large net withdrawals by customers (such as before Christmas) or bank runs. Traditionally, central banks do not pay interest on reserve balances, but such schemes have become increasingly common in the 21st century. Funds in banks that are not retained as a reserve are available to be lent, at interest.

In bookkeeping, reserves are ordinarily part of the shareholders equity in a company's financial statement. Bank reserves, on the other hand, are part of the bank's assets. In a bank's annual report, bank reserves are referred to as "cash and balances at central banks".

== Terms ==
- Reserves on deposit (of a commercial bank): the deposit accounts for the commercial bank at the central bank.
- Vault cash (of a commercial bank): paper currency and current coins owned by the commercial bank and (generally) held in the bank vaults of the commercial bank.
- Borrowed reserves: bank reserves that were obtained by borrowing from the central bank.
- Non-borrowed reserves: bank reserves that were not obtained by borrowing from the central bank.
- Required reserves: the amount of reserves (reserves on deposit plus vault cash) that commercial banks are required to hold, as determined by the central bank as a function of the commercial bank's deposit liabilities.
- Excess reserves: bank reserves in excess of the reserve requirement. A portion of excess reserves (or even all of them) may be desired reserves.
- Free reserves: the amount by which excess reserves exceed borrowed reserves.
- Total reserves: all bank reserves, i.e. cash in the vault, plus reserves on deposit at the central bank, also borrowed plus non-borrowed, also required plus excess.

== Cash held by banks ==
Banking regulators typically determine the banks' reserve requirements, including the minimum proportion of a bank's assets that banks must hold in cash. Subject to such directives, banks tend to keep their cash reserves as low as is prudently necessary, as banks do not earn interest on it, and it is a cost to keep secure. In the United States such reserves are often called vault money.

The amount of money needed to be at call varies because of a number of factors. For example, there is a higher demand at Christmas time when commercial activity is highest. Also, when workers were paid in cash, there was a higher demand on payday. There may also be sudden, unexpected surges in demand for cash by individuals during economic panics, which may result in a "run on the bank" as individuals seek to withdraw money from bank accounts.

When banks find that their cash holdings are below the anticipated cash requirements, especially if they are below the prescribed minimum, they would either borrow cash from other banks that have surplus holdings (e.g., via the interbank market) or from the monetary authority (e.g., via the "discount window"). When banks no longer believe they need as much cash on hand they would return the cash to the monetary authority, or offer the surplus to other banks.

== Bank deposits at central bank ==
Commercial banks are usually required to keep funds in the bank's account with the central bank. Such funds are usually counted as part of the banks' reserves. Some central banks pay interest on these deposits while others do not.

== See also ==
- Capital requirement
- Gold reserve
- Monetary base
