= Michael Kumhof =

German economist

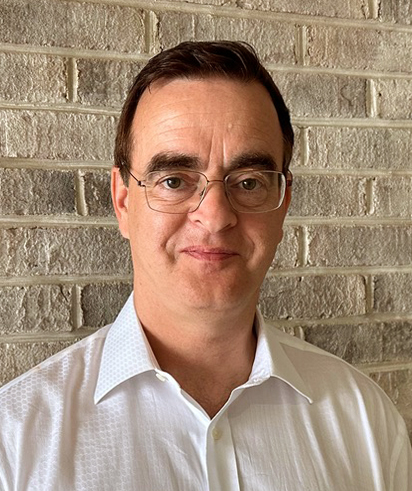
Michael Kumhof, 2023

Michael Kumhof (born 15 October 1962) is a German researcher and economist. He is the senior research advisor in the Bank of England's research hub. He is most known for his research into the financial system, income inequalities and the oil supply.

== Biography ==
In his previous work at the IMF, he was responsible for developing the International Monetary Fund's Global Integrated Monetary and Fiscal Model (a Dynamic stochastic general equilibrium model). The model is used for IMF policy and scenario analyses in multilateral and bilateral surveillance, for the World Economic Outlook, and for G20 work. It is also used by several central banks.

As a researcher, one of Kumhof's most noticed publications is the IMF working paper The Chicago Plan Revisited, in which he and co-author Jaromir Benes use modern tools to analyse the Chicago plan, a collection of banking reforms suggested by University of Chicago economists in the wake of the Great Depression. It has been called IMF's epic plan to conjure away debt and dethrone bankers.

Other noticeable publications are: the IMF working paper "Inequality, Leverage and Crises: The Case of Endogenous Default", in which the authors Kumhof et al. studies how crises can arise as a result of increasing income inequalities;

And the IMF working paper "The Future of Oil: Geology versus Technology", in which the authors presents a new model for forecasting oil prices and oil output, based on both the geological and technological view, and it performs far better than existing empirical models, one of the more important conclusions is that they predict a near doubling of oil prices in the next decade. Ignoring the peak oil issue would be "highly unscientific, even irresponsible", says Michael Kumhof.

In February 2016 Kumhof was added to the editorial board of Ledger, the first peer-reviewed academic journal dedicated to cryptocurrency and blockchain technology research. The journal covers aspects of mathematics, computer science, engineering, law, economics and philosophy that relates to cryptocurrencies such as bitcoin.

== Major publications ==
- The Chicago Plan Revisited (pdf), 2012, IMF Working Paper No 12/202.
- Inequality, Leverage and Crises: The Case of Endogenous Default (pdf), 2013, IMF Working Paper No 13/249.
- The Future of Oil: Geology versus Technology (pdf), 2012, IMF Working Paper No 12/109.
- Oil and the world economy: some possible futures (pdf), 2 December 2013, Phil. Trans. R. Soc. A 2014 372, 20120327.
