= Monetary transmission mechanism =

Process by which monetary policy affects the economy

The monetary transmission mechanism is the process by which monetary policy decisions affect the broader macroeconomy through multiple channels including asset prices, money markets, and general economic conditions. Such decisions are implemented through various tools including interest rates, money supply, and central bank balance sheet operations to influence aggregate demand, inflation, and overall economic performance. The transmission process operates through several key channels: the traditional interest rate channel, the credit channel, the money market channel, and various asset price channels including exchange rates and equity markets. These channels often work simultaneously and with varying importance across different economic conditions and institutional frameworks.

== Traditional interest rate channels ==
An interest rate channel may be categorized as traditional, which means monetary policy affects real (rather than nominal) interest rates, which influence investment, spending on new housing, consumer spending, and aggregate demand. An easing of monetary policy in the traditional view leads to a decrease in real interest rates, which lowers the cost of borrowing, resulting in greater investment spending, involving an overall increase in aggregate demand.

== Money market channels ==
The monetary view emphasizes the role of money markets in the transmission of monetary policy to the broader economy. This channel operates through changes in money market conditions, affecting both the quantity and price of money, which in turn influences broader economic activity.

Recent research has highlighted the significance of money markets in monetary transmission, particularly through:

- Money market rates and spreads

Changes in monetary policy affect money market rates and spreads, which influence broader financial conditions and economic activity.

- Inflation expectations

The interaction between money growth rules and interest rates plays a crucial role in shaping inflation expectations and monetary policy effectiveness.

- Money multiplier effects

Changes in the monetary base influence the money multiplier, affecting the broader money supply and credit creation process.

- Portfolio rebalancing

Monetary policy actions lead to portfolio adjustments in money markets, which affect asset prices and yields across different market segments.

== Credit view ==
In addition to the traditional interest rate and money market channel, which focuses on the effects of interest rate changes and money growth, there are other methods through which monetary policy can influence economic outcomes and aggregate demand. These alternative channels are classified under the credit view, which argues that financial frictions in the credit markets create additional channels that lead to changes in aggregate demand. These channels operate through effects on bank lending, as well as the effects on the balance sheet of a given firm or household.

- Bank lending channel

Monetary policy affects bank deposits, leading to changes in the amount of bank loans and investment in residential housing.

- Balance sheet channel

Monetary policy affects stock prices, leading to moral hazard and adverse selection, which leads to changes in lending activity and investment

- Cash flow channel

Monetary policy leads to changes in nominal interest rates, which affects cash flow, leading to moral hazard, adverse selection, and changes in lending activity and investment

- Unanticipated price level channel

Monetary policy can lead to unanticipated price level changes, resulting in moral hazard, adverse selection, and changes in lending activity and investment

- Household liquidity effects

Monetary policy affects stock prices, leading to changes in financial wealth and the probability of financial distress, which affects residential housing and consumer spending

== Other asset price effects ==
Finally, other asset price effects have separate channels allowing monetary policy to influence aggregate demand:

- Exchange rate effects on net exports

Monetary policy affects real interest rates and the exchange rate, leading to changes in net exports

- Tobin's q theory

Monetary policy affects stock prices, leading to changes in Tobin's q (the market value of firms divided by the replacement cost of capital) and investment

- Wealth effects

Monetary policy affects stock prices, which affects financial wealth and consumption (consumer spending on nondurable goods and services)

- Uncertainty channel

Stock prices respond more aggressively and asymmetrically to monetary policy under high uncertainty. The time-varying link between monetary policy and stock prices depends on uncertainty.

== See also ==
- AD–AS model
- Monetary policy reaction function
- Phillips curve
- Taylor rule
