= Reserve requirement =

Type of regulation on commercial banks

Reserve requirements are central bank regulations that set the minimum amount that a commercial bank must hold in liquid assets. This minimum amount, commonly referred to as the commercial bank's reserve, is generally determined by the central bank on the basis of a specified proportion of deposit liabilities of the bank. This rate is commonly referred to as the cash reserve ratio or shortened as reserve ratio. Though the definitions vary, the commercial bank's reserves normally consist of cash held by the bank and stored physically in the bank vault (vault cash), plus the amount of the bank's balance in that bank's account with the central bank. A bank is at liberty to hold in reserve sums above this minimum requirement, commonly referred to as excess reserves.

In some areas such as the euro area and the UK, tightening of reserve requirements in the home country is found to be associated with higher lending by foreign branches. For this reason, the reserve ratio is sometimes used by a country’s monetary authority as a tool in monetary policy, to influence the country's money supply by limiting or expanding the amount of lending by the banks. Monetary authorities increase the reserve requirement only after careful consideration because an abrupt change may cause liquidity problems for banks with low excess reserves; they generally prefer to use other monetary policy instruments to implement their monetary policy. In many countries (except Brazil, China, India, Russia), reserve requirements are generally not altered frequently in implementing a country's monetary policy because of the short-term disruptive effect on financial markets. In several countries, including the United States, there are today zero reserve requirements.

== Policy objective ==
One of the critical functions of a country's central bank is to maintain public confidence in the banking system, as under a fractional-reserve banking system banks are not expected to hold cash to cover all deposit liabilities in full. One of the mechanisms used by most central banks to further this objective is to set a reserve requirement to ensure that banks have, in normal circumstances, sufficient cash on hand in the event that large deposits are withdrawn, which may precipitate a bank run. In the United States, the Federal Reserve reduced reserve requirement ratios to zero percent effective March 26, 2020, eliminating reserve requirements for all depository institutions.

Bank deposits are usually of a relatively short-term duration, and may be "at call", while loans made by banks tend to be longer-term, resulting in a risk that customers may at any time collectively wish to withdraw cash out of their accounts in excess of the bank reserves. The reserves only provide liquidity to cover withdrawals within the normal pattern. Banks and the central bank expect that in normal circumstances only a proportion of deposits will be withdrawn at the same time, and that the reserves will be sufficient to meet the demand for cash. However, banks may find themselves in a shortfall situation or experience a bank run, when depositors wish to withdraw more funds than the reserves held by the bank. In that event, the bank experiencing the liquidity shortfall may borrow short-term funds in the interbank lending market from banks with a surplus. In exceptional situations, the central bank may provide funds to cover the short-term shortfall as lender of last resort. If the bank's liquidity problem exceeds the central bank's desire to continue as "lender of last resort", as happened during the 2008 financial crisis, the government may try to restore confidence in the banking system, for example, by providing government guarantees.

== Effects on money supply ==
=== Textbook view ===
Many textbooks describe a system in which reserve requirements can act as a tool of a country’s monetary policy though these bear little resemblance to reality and many central banks impose no such requirements. The commonly assumed requirement is 10% though almost no central bank and no major central bank imposes such a ratio requirement.

With higher reserve requirements, there would be less funds available to banks for lending. Under this view, the money multiplier compounds the effect of bank lending on the money supply. The multiplier effect on the money supply is governed by the following formulas:

$M_1=\mathit{MB} \times m \,$ : definitional relationship between monetary base MB (bank reserves plus currency held by the non-bank public) and the narrowly defined money supply, $M_1$,

$m=\frac{(1+c)}{(c+R)} = \frac{1+\frac{C}{D}}{\frac{C}{D}+R}$ : derived formula for the money multiplier m, the factor by which lending and re-lending leads $M_1$ to be a multiple of the monetary base:

where notationally,

$c =$ the currency ratio: the ratio of the public's holdings of currency (undeposited cash) to the public's holdings of demand deposits; and

$R =$ the total reserve ratio (the ratio of legally required plus non-required reserve holdings of banks to demand deposit liabilities of banks).

This limit on the money supply does not apply in the real world.

=== Endogenous money view ===
Central banks dispute the money multiplier theory of the reserve requirement and instead consider money as endogenous. See endogenous money.

Jaromir Benes and Michael Kumhof of the IMF Research Department report that the "deposit multiplier" of the undergraduate economics textbook, where monetary aggregates are created at the initiative of the central bank, through an initial injection of high-powered money into the banking system that gets multiplied through bank lending, turns the actual operation of the monetary transmission mechanism on its head. Benes and Kumhof assert that in most cases where banks ask for replenishment of depleted reserves, the central bank obliges. Under this view, reserves therefore impose no constraints, as the deposit multiplier is simply, in the words of Kydland and Prescott (1990), a myth. Under this theory, private banks almost fully control the money creation process.

== Required reserves ==
=== China ===
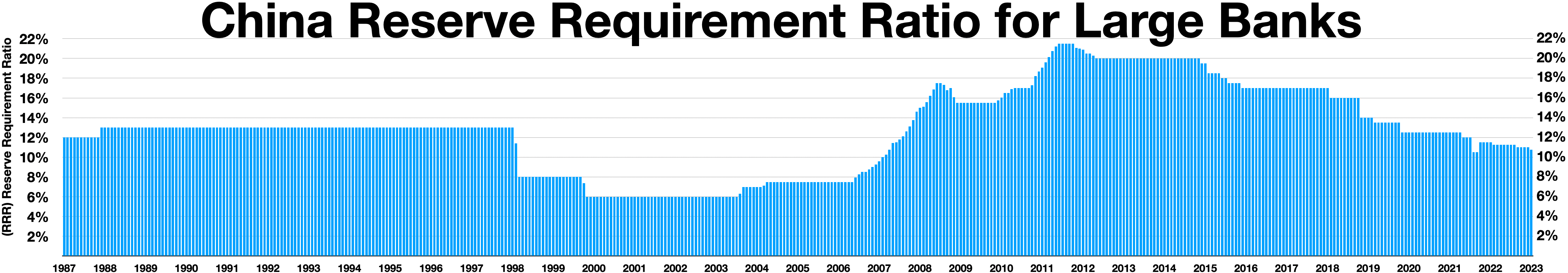
China's Reserve Requirement Ratio for large banks

The People's Bank of China uses changes in the reserve requirement as an inflation-fighting tool, and raised the reserve requirement ten times in 2007 and eleven times since the beginning of 2010.

=== India ===
The Reserve Bank of India uses changes in the CRR as a liquidity management tool, hiked it alongside SLR to navigate the 2008 financial crisis. RBI introduced and withdrew Incremental - Cash reserve ratio I-CRR over and above CRR for managing liquidity.

== Countries and districts without reserve requirements ==
The US, Canada, the UK, New Zealand, Australia, Sweden and Hong Kong have no reserve requirements.

This does not mean that banks can—even in theory—create money without limit. On the contrary, banks are constrained by capital requirements, which are arguably more important than reserve requirements even in countries that have reserve requirements.

A commercial bank's overnight reserves are not permitted to become negative. The central bank will step in to lend a bank funds if necessary so that this does not happen. Historically, a central bank might have run out of reserves to lend to banks with liquidity problems and so had to suspend redemptions, but this can no longer happen to modern central banks because of the end of the gold standard worldwide, which means that all nations use a fiat currency.

A zero reserve requirement cannot be explained by a theory that holds that monetary policy works by varying the quantity of money using the reserve requirement.

Even in the United States, which retained formal reserve requirements until 2020, the notion of controlling the money supply by targeting the quantity of base money fell out of favor many years ago, and now the pragmatic explanation of monetary policy refers to targeting the interest rate to control the broad money supply. (See also Regulation D (FRB).)

=== United Kingdom ===
In the United Kingdom, commercial banks are called clearing banks with direct access to the clearing system.

The Bank of England, the central bank for the United Kingdom, previously set a voluntary reserve ratio, and not a minimum reserve requirement. In theory, this meant that commercial banks could retain zero reserves. The average cash reserve ratio across the entire United Kingdom banking system, though, was higher during that period, at about 0.15% as of 1999.

From 1971 to 1980, commercial banks agreed to a reserve ratio of 1.5%. In 1981 this requirement was abolished.

From 1981 to 2009, each commercial bank set out its own monthly voluntary reserve target in a contract with the Bank of England. Both shortfalls and excesses of reserves relative to the commercial bank's own target over an averaging period of one day would result in a charge, incentivising the commercial bank to stay near its target, a system known as reserves averaging.

Upon the parallel introduction of quantitative easing and interest on excess reserves in 2009, banks were no longer required to set out a target, and so were no longer penalised for holding excess reserves; indeed, they were proportionally compensated for holding all their reserves at the Bank Rate (the Bank of England now uses the same interest rate for its bank rate, its deposit rate and its interest rate target). In the absence of an agreed target, the concept of excess reserves does not really apply to the Bank of England any longer, so it is technically incorrect to call its new policy "interest on excess reserves".

=== Canada ===
Canada abolished its reserve requirement in 1992.

=== Australia ===
Australia abolished "statutory reserve deposits" in 1988, which were replaced with 1% non-callable deposits.

=== United States ===
In the Thomas Amendment to the Agricultural Adjustment Act of 1933, the Federal Reserve was granted the authority to set reserve requirements jointly with the president as one of several provisions that sought to mitigate or prevent deflation. The power was granted to the Federal Reserve, without presidential consent, in the Banking Act of 1935. Under the International Banking Act of 1978, the same reserve ratios would apply to branches of foreign banks operating in the United States.

The United States removed reserve requirements for nonpersonal time deposits and eurocurrency liabilities on 27 December 1990 and for net transaction accounts on 27 March 2020, thus eliminating reserve requirements altogether. Before that, the Board of Governors of the Federal Reserve System used to set reserve requirements ("liquidity ratio") based on categories of deposit liabilities ("net transaction accounts" or "NTAs") of depository institutions, such as commercial banks including U.S. branches of a foreign bank, savings and loan association, savings bank, and credit union. For a time, checking accounts were subject to reserve requirements, whereas there was no reserve requirement on savings accounts and time deposit accounts of individuals. The Board for some time set a zero reserve requirement for banks with eligible deposits up to $16 million, 3% for banks up to $122.3 million, and 10% thereafter. The total removal of reserve requirements followed the Federal Reserve's shift to an "ample-reserves" system, in which the Federal Reserve Banks pay member banks interest on excess reserves held by them.

The total amount of all NTAs held by customers with U.S. depository institutions, plus the U.S. paper currency and coin currency held by the nonbank public, is called M1.

== Reserve requirements by country ==
The reserve ratios set in each country and district vary. The following list is non-exhaustive:

Country or district	Reserve ratio (%)	Notes
Argentina	40.9	Reserve Requirement Ratio: Savings Deposits: Domestic Currency was set as 40.9 % in Nov 2024
Australia	Zero	Statutory reserve deposits abolished in 1988, replaced with 1% non-callable deposits
Bangladesh	6.00	Raised from 5.50, effective from 15 December 2010
Brazil	21.00	Term deposits have a 33% RRR and savings accounts a 20% ratio.
Bulgaria	10.00	Banks shall maintain minimum required reserves to the amount of 10% of the deposit base (effective from 1 December 2008) with two exceptions (effective from 1 January 2009): 1. on funds attracted by banks from abroad: 5%; 2. on funds attracted from state and local government budgets: 0%.
Burundi	8.50	
Canada	Zero	,
Chile	4.50	
China	17.00	China cut bank reserves again to counter slowdown as of 29 February 2016.
Costa Rica	15.00	
Croatia	9.00	Down from 12%, from 10 April 2020
Czech Republic	4.00	Effective 2 January 2025. Up from 2 % between October 2009 and January 2025.
Denmark	Zero	
Eurozone	1.00	Effective 18 January 2012. Down from 2% between January 1999 and January 2012.
Ghana	9.00	
Hong Kong	Zero	
Hungary	10.00	Since April 2023. Up from 5.00 percent.
Iceland	2.00	
India	4.50	6 April 2023,
Israel	6.00	set by the Monetary Committee of the Bank of Israel.
Jordan	8.00	
Latvia	3.00	Just after the Parex Bank bailout (24.12.2008), Latvian Central Bank decreased the RRR from 7% (?) down to 3%
Lebanon	30.00	
Lithuania	6.00	
Malawi	15.00	
Mexico	10.50	
Nepal	6.00	From 20 July 2014 (for commercial banks)
New Zealand	Zero	1985
Nigeria	45.00	Retain CRR at 45.00% for deposit money banks and increase that of merchant banks to 14.00% effective 26 March 2024
Norway	Zero	
Pakistan	5.00	Since 1 November 2008
Philippines	9.50	Since 30 June 2023
Poland	3.50	Since 31 March 2022
Romania	8.00	As of 24 May 2015 for lei. 10% for foreign currency as of 24 October 2016.
Russia	4.00	Effective 1 April 2011, up from 2.5% in January 2011.
South Africa	2.50	
Sri Lanka	8.00	With effect from 29 April 2011. 8% of total rupee deposit liabilities.
Suriname	25.00	Down from 27%, effective 1 January 2007
Sweden	Zero	Effective 1 April 1994
Switzerland	2.50	
Taiwan	7.00	
Tajikistan	20.00	
Trinidad and Tobago	10.00	As of 24 July 2024
Turkey	8.50	Since 19 February 2013
United States	Zero	The Federal Reserve reduced reserve requirement ratios to 0% effective on 26 March 2020.
Zambia	8.00	

== See also ==
- Bank regulation
- Basel III
- Capital requirement
- Capital adequacy ratio
- Criticism of the Federal Reserve
- Excess reserves
- Financial repression
- Fractional-reserve banking
- Full-reserve banking
- Great Contraction
- Islamic banking
- Monetary policy of central banks
- Money creation
- Money supply
- Negative interest on excess reserves
- Statutory liquidity ratio
- Tier 1 capital
- Tier 2 capital
