= Bank =

Financial institution that accepts deposits

A bank is a financial institution that accepts deposits from the public and creates a demand deposit while making loans. Lending activities can be directly performed by the bank or indirectly through capital markets.

Banks play an important role in financial stability and the economy of a country, so most countries exercise a high degree of regulation over banks. Most countries have institutionalized a system known as fractional-reserve banking, under which banks hold liquid assets equal to only a portion of their current liabilities. In addition to other regulations intended to ensure liquidity, banks are generally subject to minimum capital requirements based on an international set of capital standards, the Basel Accords.

Banking in its modern sense evolved in the 14th century in the prosperous cities of Renaissance Italy but, in many ways, functioned as a continuation of ideas and concepts of credit and lending that have their roots in the ancient world. In the history of banking, a number of banking dynasties – notably, the Medicis, the Pazzi, the Fuggers, the Welsers, the Berenbergs, and the Rothschilds – have played a central role over many centuries. The oldest existing retail bank is Banca Monte dei Paschi di Siena (founded in 1472), while the oldest existing merchant bank is Berenberg Bank (founded in 1590).

A banker is a person who engages in the business of banking.

== Activities ==
=== Standard business ===
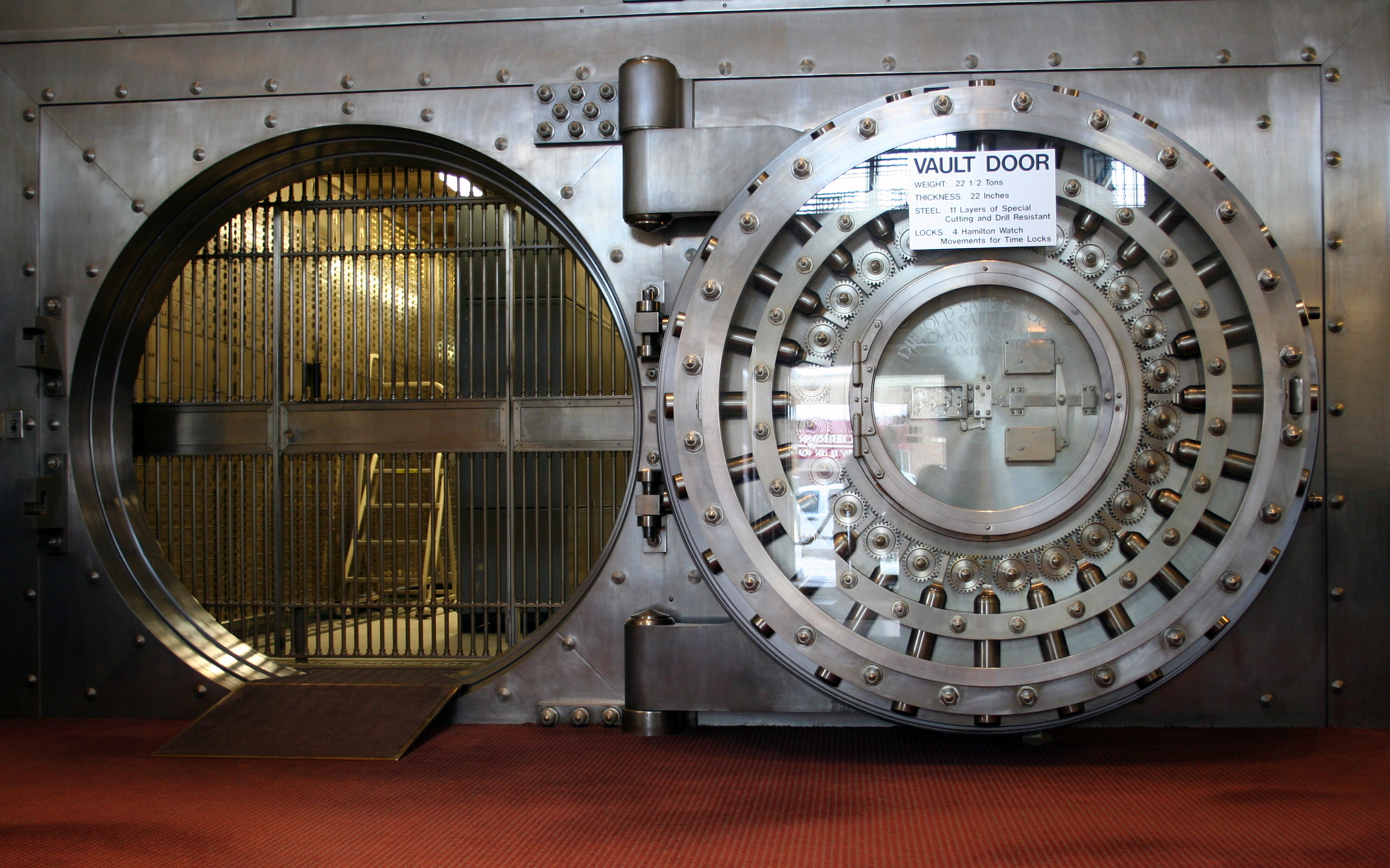
Large door to an old bank vault.

Banks act as payment agents by conducting checking or current accounts for customers, paying checks drawn by customers in the bank, and collecting checks deposited to customers' current accounts. Banks also enable customer payments via other payment methods such as Automated Clearing House (ACH), wire transfers or telegraphic transfer, EFTPOS, and automated teller machines (ATMs).

Banks borrow money by accepting funds deposited on current accounts, by accepting term deposits, and by issuing debt securities such as banknotes and bonds. Banks lend money by making advances to customers on current accounts, by making installment loans, and by investing in marketable debt securities and other forms of money lending.

Banks provide different payment services, and a bank account is considered indispensable by most businesses and individuals. Nonbanks that provide payment services such as remittance companies are normally not considered as an adequate substitute for a bank account.

Banks issue new money when they make loans. In contemporary banking systems, regulators set a minimum level of reserve funds that banks must hold against the deposit liabilities created by the funding of these loans, in order to ensure that the banks can meet demands for payment of such deposits. These reserves can be acquired through the acceptance of new deposits, sale of other assets, or borrowing from other banks including the central bank.

=== Range of activities ===
Activities undertaken by banks include personal banking, corporate banking, investment banking, private banking, transaction banking, insurance, consumer finance, trade finance and other related.

=== Channels ===
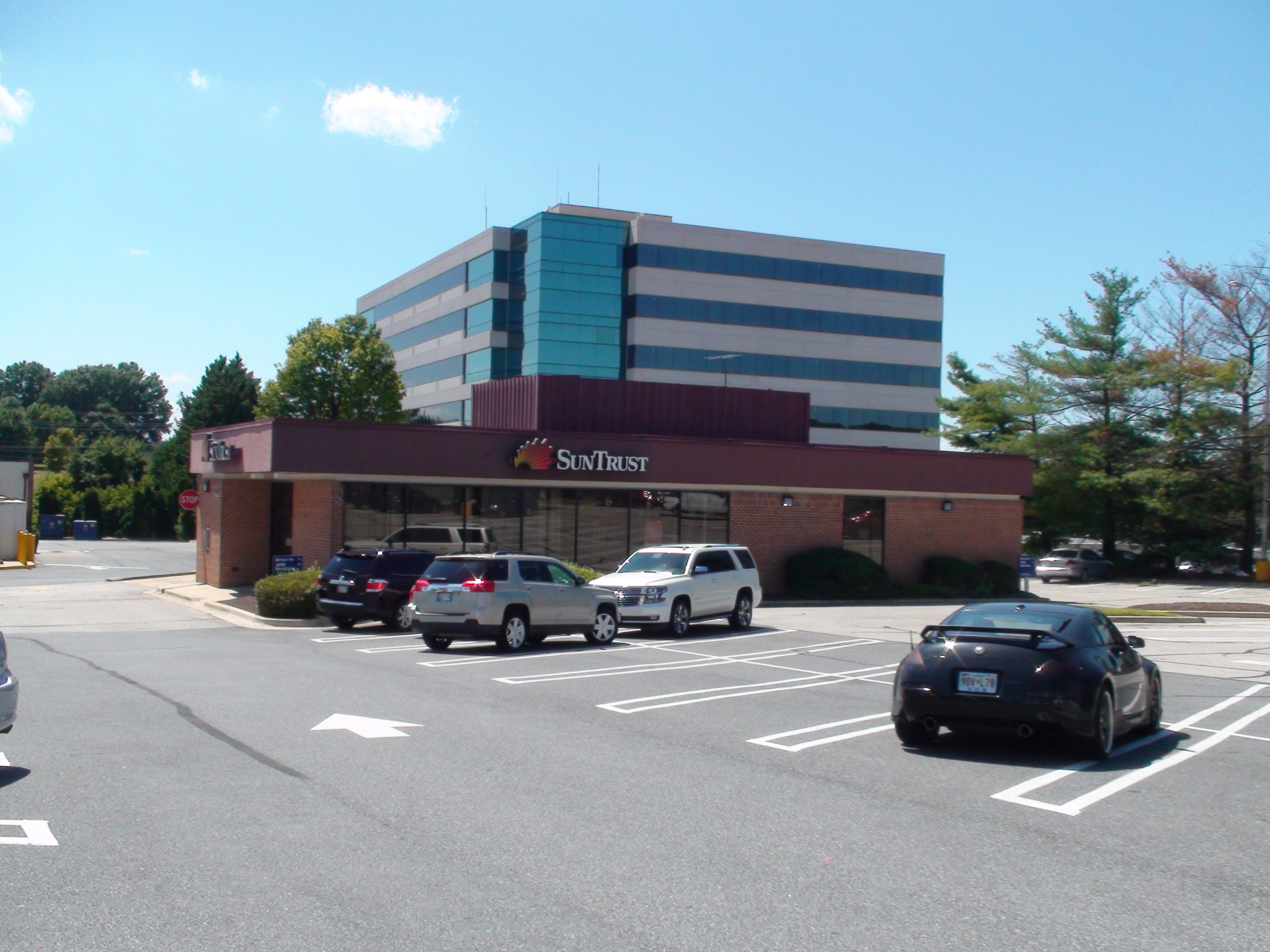
An American bank in Maryland.

Banks offer many different channels to access their banking and other services:

- Branch, in-person banking in a retail location
- Automated teller machine banking adjacent to or remote from the bank
- Bank by mail: Most banks accept check deposits via mail and use mail to communicate to their customers
- Online banking over the Internet to perform multiple types of transactions
- Mobile banking is using one's mobile phone to conduct banking transactions
- Telephone banking allows customers to conduct transactions over the telephone with an automated attendant, or when requested, with a telephone operator
- Video banking performs banking transactions or professional banking consultations via a remote video and audio connection. Video banking can be performed via purpose built banking transaction machines (similar to an Automated teller machine) or via a video conference enabled bank branch clarification
- Relationship manager, mostly for private banking or business banking, who visits customers at their homes or businesses
- Direct Selling Agent, who works for the bank based on a contract, whose main job is to increase the customer base for the bank

=== Business models ===
Banks generate revenue in a variety of different ways including interest, transaction fees and financial advice. Traditionally, the most significant method is via charging interest on the capital it lends out to customers. The bank profits from the difference between the level of interest it pays for deposits and other sources of funds, and the level of interest it charges in its lending activities.

This difference is referred to as the spread between the cost of funds and the loan interest rate. Historically, profitability from lending activities has been cyclical and dependent on the needs and strengths of loan customers and the stage of the economic cycle. Fees and financial advice constitute a more stable revenue stream and banks have therefore placed more emphasis on these revenue lines to smooth their financial performance.

In the past 20 years, American banks have taken many measures to ensure that they remain profitable while responding to increasingly changing market conditions.

- First, this includes the Gramm–Leach–Bliley Act, which allows banks again to merge with investment and insurance houses. Merging banking, investment, and insurance functions allows traditional banks to respond to increasing consumer demands for "one-stop shopping" by enabling cross-selling of products (which, the banks hope, will also increase profitability).
- Second, they have expanded the use of risk-based pricing from business lending to consumer lending, which means charging higher interest rates to those customers that are considered to be a higher credit risk and thus increased chance of default on loans. This helps to offset the losses from bad loans, lowers the price of loans to those who have better credit histories, and offers credit products to high risk customers who would otherwise be denied credit.
- Third, they have sought to increase the methods of payment processing available to the general public and business clients. These products include debit cards, prepaid cards, smart cards, and credit cards. They make it easier for consumers to conveniently make transactions and smooth their consumption over time (in some countries with underdeveloped financial systems, it is still common to deal strictly in cash, including carrying suitcases filled with cash to purchase a home).

However, with the convenience of easy credit, there is also an increased risk that consumers will mismanage their financial resources and accumulate excessive debt. Banks make money from card products through interest charges and fees charged to credit and debit card holders, and transaction fees to retailers who accept the bank's cards for payments.

This helps in making a profit and facilitates economic development as a whole.

Recently, as banks have been faced with pressure from fintechs, new and additional business models have been suggested such as freemium, monetization of data, white-labeling of banking and payment applications, or the cross-selling of complementary products.

=== Products ===
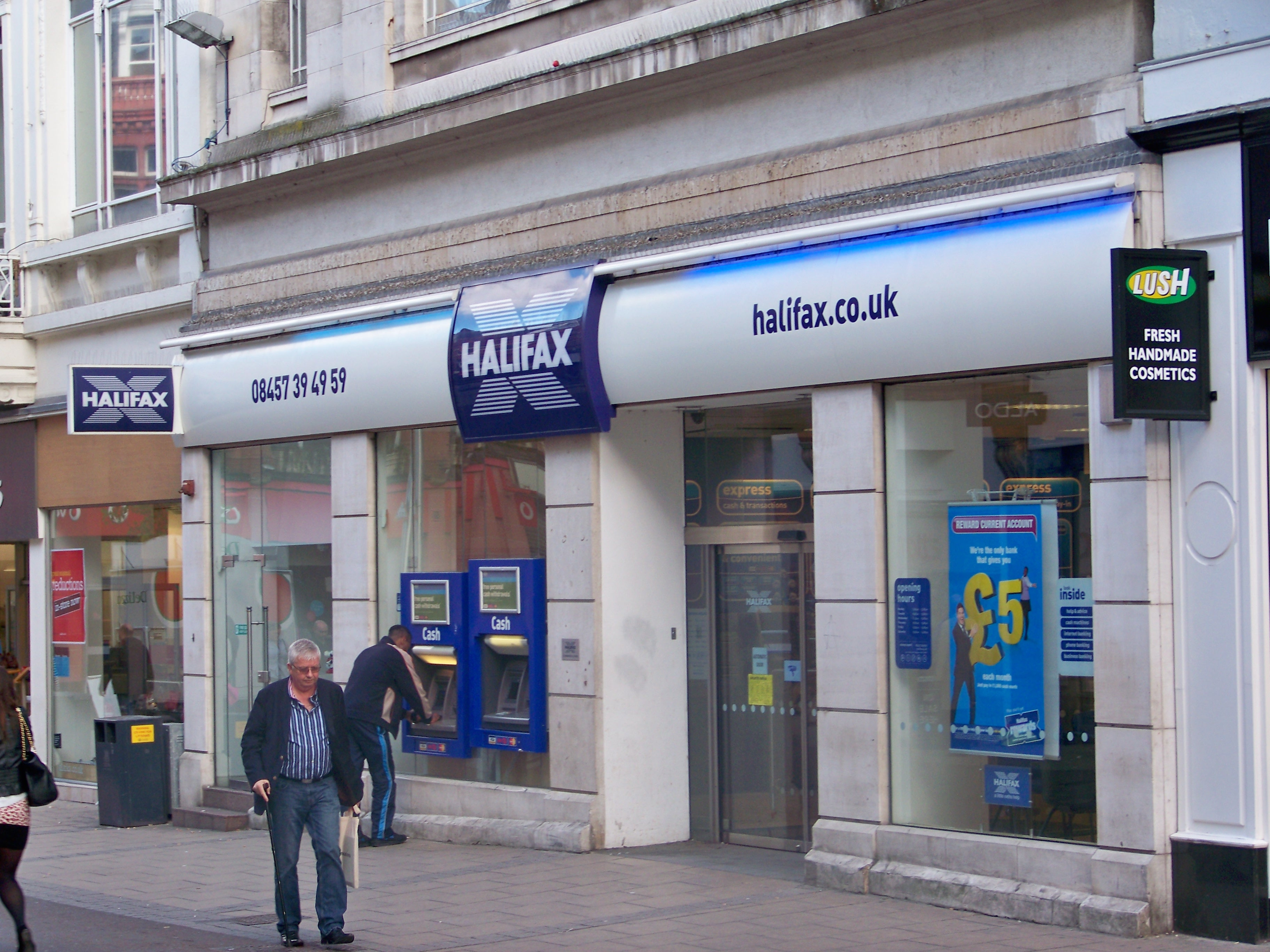
A former building society, now a modern retail bank in Leeds, West Yorkshire.

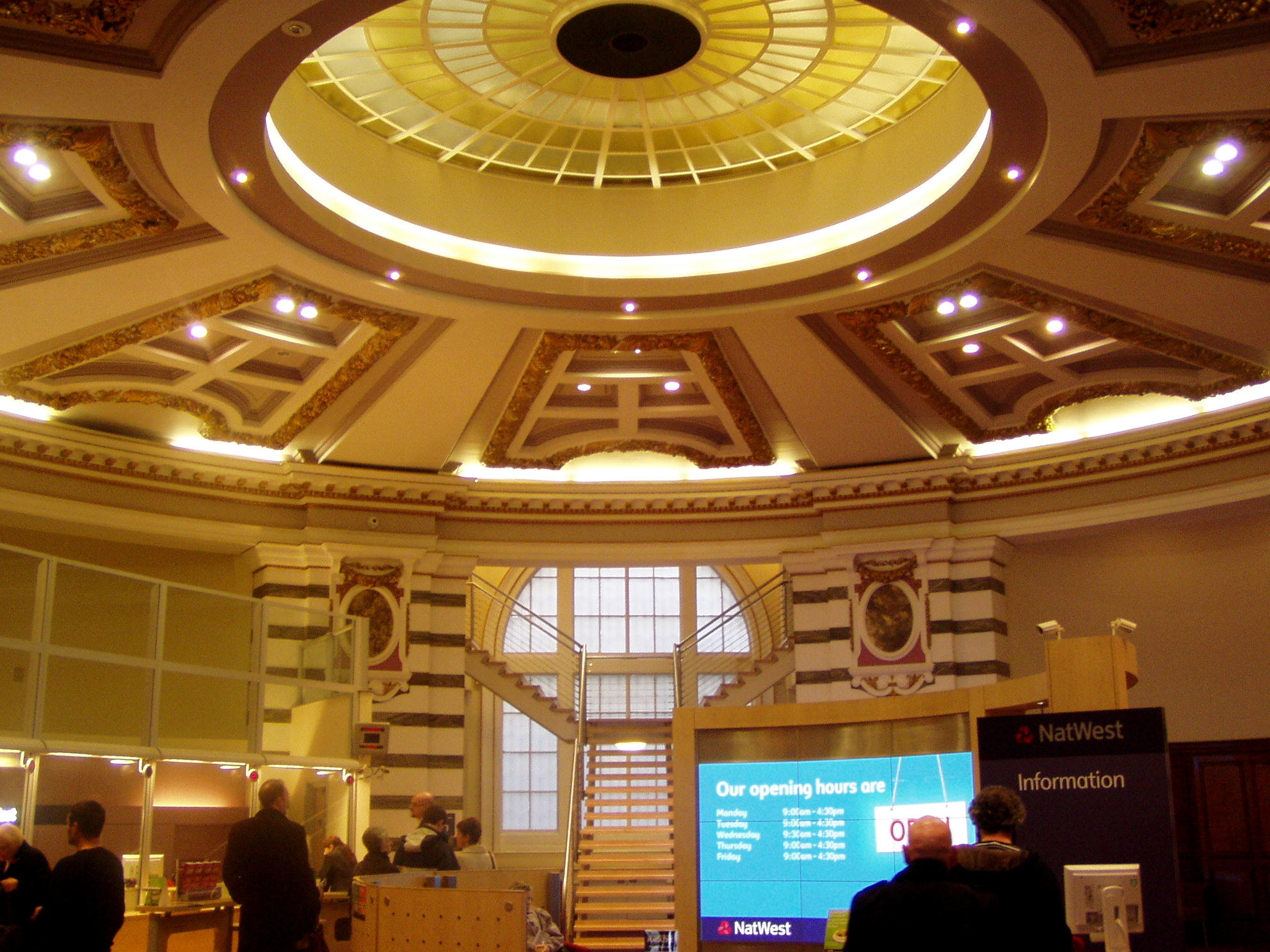
An interior of a branch of National Westminster Bank on Castle Street, Liverpool

==== Retail ====
- ATM card
- Credit card
- Debit card
- Savings account
- Recurring deposit account
- Fixed deposit account
- Money market account
- Certificate of deposit (CD)
- Individual retirement account (IRA)
- Mortgage
- Mutual fund
- Personal loan (Secured and Unsecured Personal loan)
- Time deposits
- Current accounts
- Check (financial instrument)
- Automated teller machine (ATM)
- National Electronic Fund Transfer (NEFT)
- Real-time gross settlement (RTGS)

==== Business (or commercial/investment) banking ====
- Business loan
- Capital raising (equity / debt / hybrids)
- Revolving credit
- Risk management (foreign exchange (FX), interest rates, commodities, derivatives)
- Term loan
- Cash management services (lock box, remote deposit capture, merchant processing)
- Credit services
- Securities Services

== History ==
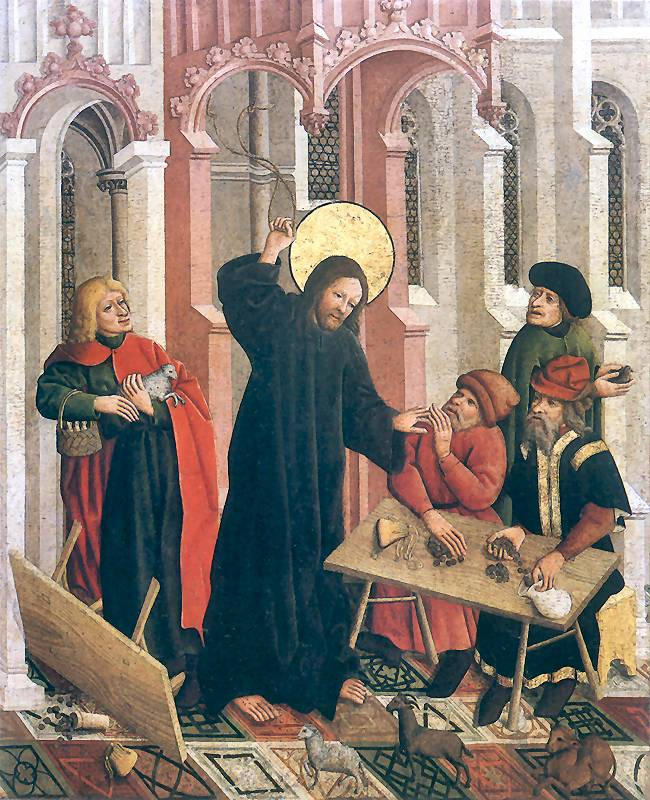
This 15th-century painting depicts money-dealers at a banca (bench) during the Cleansing of the Temple.

Banking as an archaic activity (or quasi-banking) is thought to have begun as early as the end of the 4th millennium BCE, to the 3rd millennia BCE.

=== Medieval ===
In Europe, the first recorded instances of private banks were run by the Knights Templar. The Knights provided safe passage for pilgrims traveling to Jerusalem. To avoid being targeted by robbers because of the large sum of money required for the pilgrimage, pilgrims would exchange money in Templar strongholds for a receipt. They could then withdraw the money along the route at other Templar strongholds to purchase necessities. The organization would provide these services from the 12th century until their disbandment in the early 14th century. The present era of banking can be traced to wealthy medieval Renaissance Italian city-states, whose elite families such as the Bardi and Peruzzi dominated banking in 14th-century Florence before establishing branches in many other parts of Europe. Giovanni di Bicci de' Medici set up one of the most famous Italian banks, the Medici Bank, in 1397. The Consell de Cent founded the earliest-known state deposit bank, the Taula de canvi de Barcelona (Table of Change), in 1401 at Barcelona. This was followed by The Bank of Saint George, created in 1407 at Genoa, Italy.

=== Early modern ===
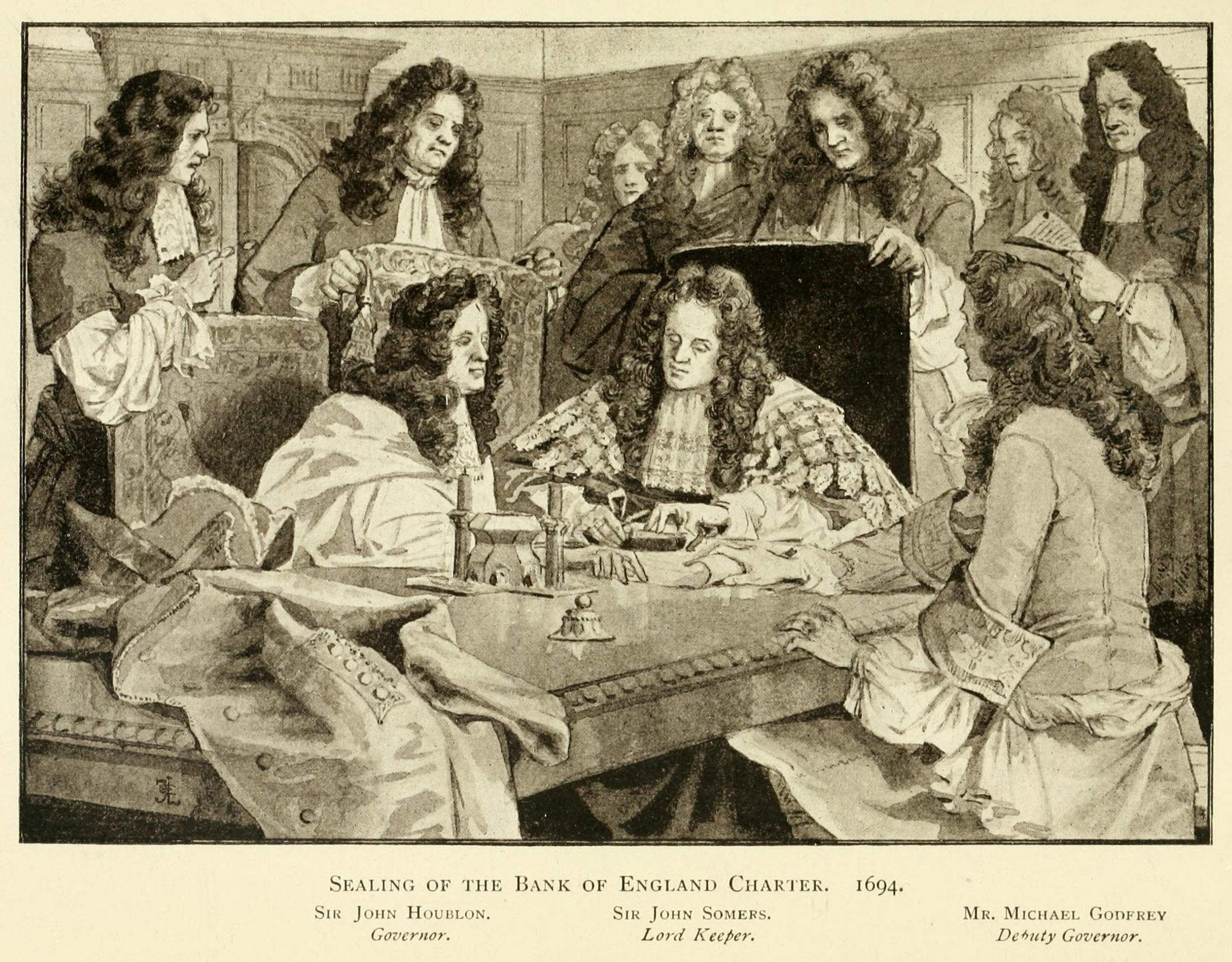
Sealing of the Bank of England Charter (1694), by Lady Jane Lindsay, 1905.

Fractional reserve banking and the issue of banknotes emerged in the 17th and 18th centuries. Merchants started to store their gold with the goldsmiths of London, who possessed private vaults, and who charged a fee for that service. In exchange for each deposit of precious metal, the goldsmiths issued receipts certifying the quantity and purity of the metal they held as a bailee; these receipts could not be assigned, only the original depositor could collect the stored goods.

Gradually the goldsmiths began to lend money out on behalf of the depositor, and promissory notes, which evolved into banknotes, were issued for money deposited as a loan to the goldsmith. By the 19th century, ordinary deposits of money in banks had become a mere loan, or mutuum, and the bank restored an equivalent sum whenever it was demanded Money, when paid into a bank, ceases altogether to be the money of the principal (see Parker v. Marchant, 1 Phillips 360); it is then the money of the banker, who is bound to return an equivalent, by paying a similar sum to that deposited with him, when he is asked for it. The goldsmith paid interest on deposits. Since the promissory notes were payable on demand, and the advances (loans) to the goldsmith's customers were repayable over a longer time-period, this was an early form of fractional reserve banking. The promissory notes developed into an assignable instrument which could circulate as a safe and convenient form of money backed by the goldsmith's promise to pay, allowing goldsmiths to advance loans with little risk of default. Thus the goldsmiths of London became the forerunners of banking by creating new money based on credit.

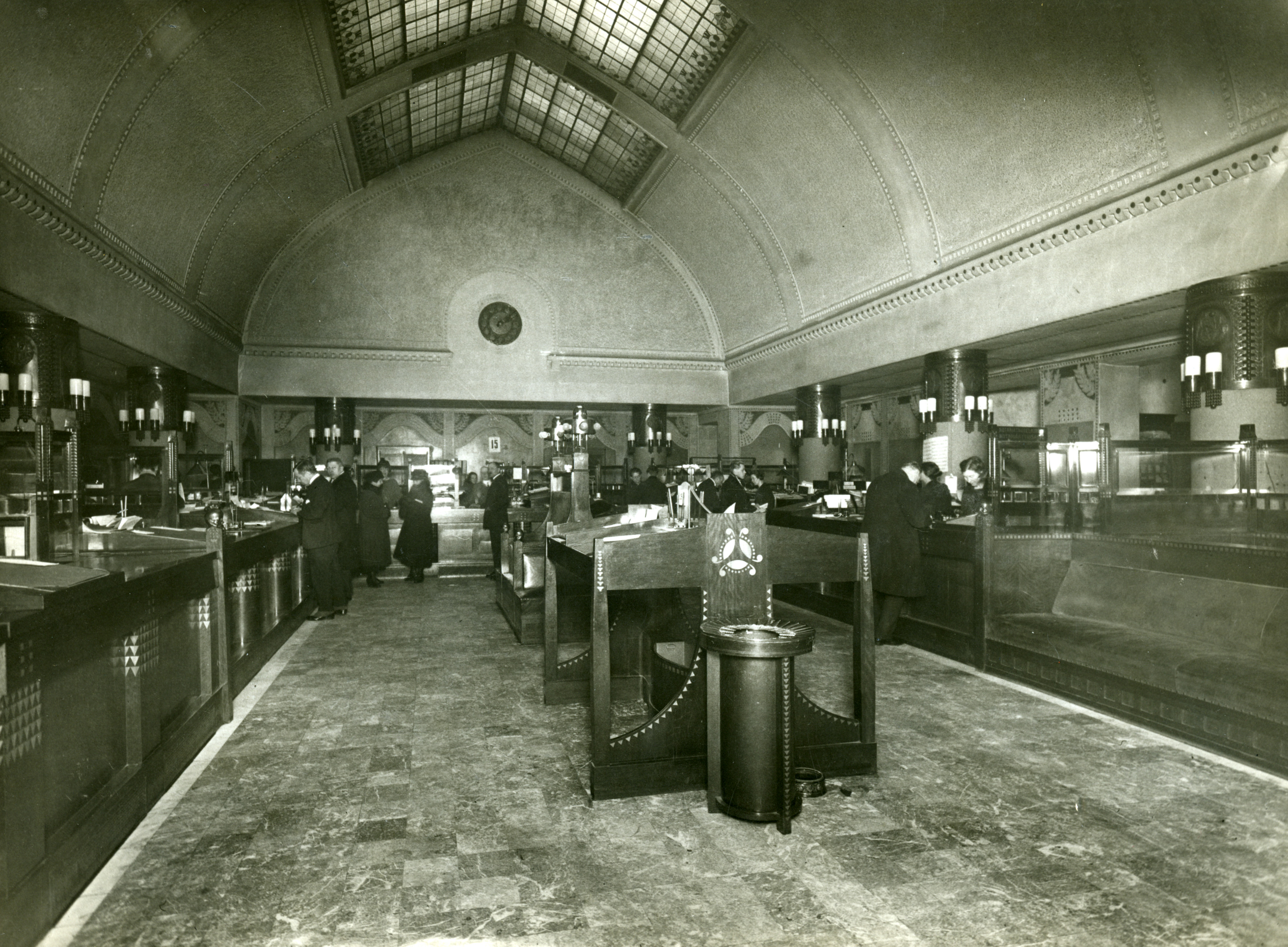
Interior of the Helsinki Branch of the Vyborg-Bank in the 1910s

The Bank of England originated the permanent issue of banknotes in 1695. The Royal Bank of Scotland established the first overdraft facility in 1728. By the beginning of the 19th century, Lubbock's Bank had established a bankers' clearing house in London to allow multiple banks to clear transactions. The Rothschilds pioneered international finance on a large scale, financing the purchase of shares in the Suez canal for the British government in 1875.

=== Modern ===
During the 20th century, developments in telecommunications and computing caused major changes to banks' operations and let banks dramatically increase in size and geographic spread. The 2008 financial crisis led to bank failures, including some of the world's largest banks, and provoked debate about bank regulation.

== Etymology ==
The word bank was taken into Middle English from Middle French banque, from Old Italian banco, meaning "table", from Old High German banc, bank "bench, counter". Benches were used as makeshift desks or exchange counters during the Renaissance by Florentine bankers, who used to make their transactions atop desks covered by green tablecloths.

== Definition ==
The definition of a bank varies from country to country. See the relevant country pages for more information.

Under English common law, a banker is defined as a person who carries on the business of banking by conducting current accounts for their customers, paying checks drawn on them as well as collecting them for their customers.

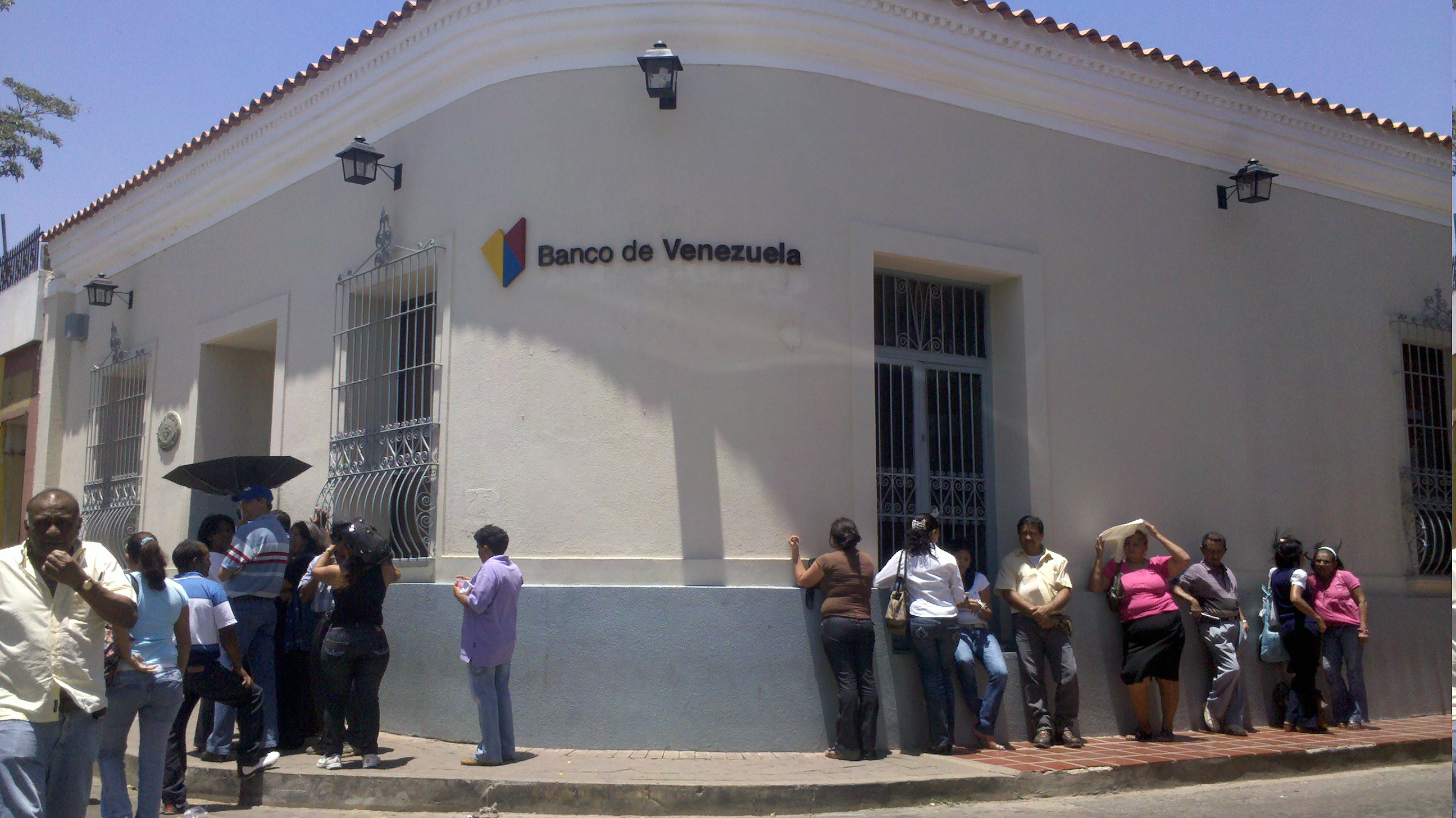
Banco de Venezuela in Coro.

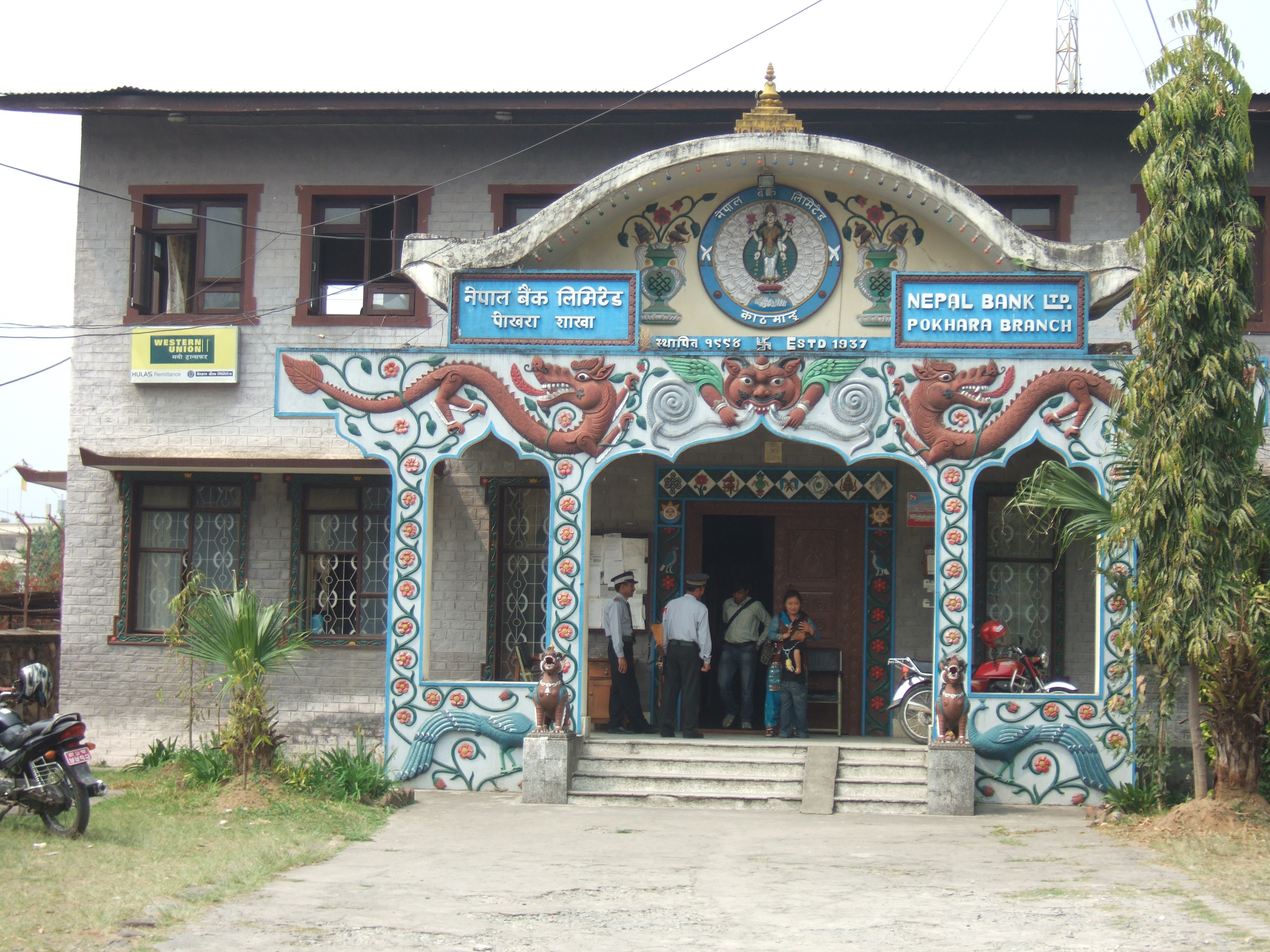
Branch of Nepal Bank in Pokhara, Western Nepal.

In most common law jurisdictions there is a Bills of Exchange Act that codifies the law in relation to negotiable instruments, including checks, and this Act contains a statutory definition of the term banker: banker includes a body of persons, whether incorporated or not, who carry on the business of banking' (Section 2, Interpretation). Although this definition seems circular, it is actually functional, because it ensures that the legal basis for bank transactions such as checks does not depend on how the bank is structured or regulated.

The business of banking is in many common law countries not defined by statute but by common law, the definition above. In other English common law jurisdictions there are statutory definitions of the business of banking or banking business. When looking at these definitions it is important to keep in mind that they are defining the business of banking for the purposes of the legislation, and not necessarily in general. In particular, most of the definitions are from legislation that has the purpose of regulating and supervising banks rather than regulating the actual business of banking. However, in many cases, the statutory definition closely mirrors the common law one. Examples of statutory definitions:

- "banking business" means the business of receiving money on current or deposit account, paying and collecting checks drawn by or paid in by customers, the making of advances to customers, and includes such other business as the Authority may prescribe for the purposes of this Act; (Banking Act (Singapore), Section 2, Interpretation).
- "banking business" means the business of either or both of the following:
1. receiving from the general public money on current, deposit, savings or other similar account repayable on demand or within less than [3 months] ... or with a period of call or notice of less than that period;
2. paying or collecting checks drawn by or paid in by customers.

Since the advent of EFTPOS (Electronic Funds Transfer at Point Of Sale), direct credit, direct debit and internet banking, the check has lost its primacy in most banking systems as a payment instrument. This has led legal theorists to suggest that the check based definition should be broadened to include financial institutions that conduct current accounts for customers and enable customers to pay and be paid by third parties, even if they do not pay and collect checks .

== Capital and risk ==
Banks face a number of risks in order to conduct their business, and how well these risks are managed and understood is a key driver behind profitability, and how much capital a bank is required to hold. Bank capital consists principally of equity, retained earnings and subordinated debt.

Some of the main risks faced by banks include:

- Credit risk: risk of loss arising from a borrower who does not make payments as promised.
- Liquidity risk: risk that a given security or asset cannot be traded quickly enough in the market to prevent a loss (or make the required profit).
- Market risk: risk that the value of a portfolio, either an investment portfolio or a trading portfolio, will decrease due to the change in value of the market risk factors.
- Operational risk: risk arising from the execution of a company's business functions.
- Reputational risk: a type of risk related to the trustworthiness of the business.
- Macroeconomic risk: risks related to the aggregate economy the bank is operating in.

The capital requirement is a bank regulation, which sets a framework within which a bank or depository institution must manage its balance sheet. The categorization of assets and capital is highly standardized so that it can be risk weighted.

After the 2008 financial crisis, regulators force banks to issue Contingent convertible bonds (CoCos). These are hybrid capital securities that absorb losses in accordance with their contractual terms when the capital of the issuing bank falls below a certain level. Then debt is reduced and bank capitalization gets a boost. Owing to their capacity to absorb losses, CoCos have the potential to satisfy regulatory capital requirement.

== Banks in the economy ==
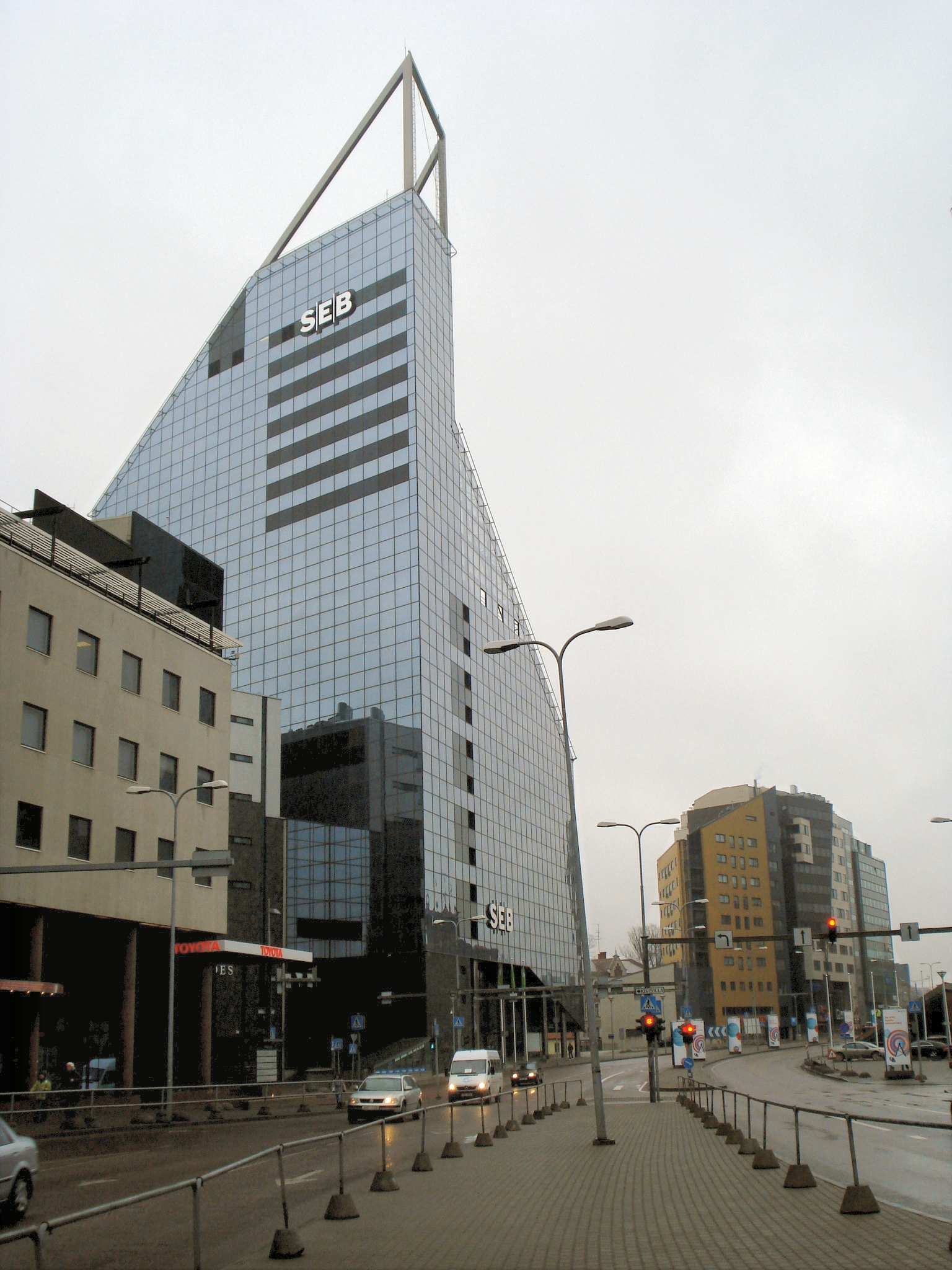
SEB main building in Tallinn, Estonia

=== Economic functions ===
The economic functions of banks include:

1. Issue of money, in the form of banknotes and current accounts subject to check or payment at the customer's order. These claims on banks can act as money because they are negotiable or repayable on demand, and hence valued at par. They are effectively transferable by mere delivery, in the case of banknotes, or by drawing a check that the payee may bank or cash.
2. Netting and settlement of payments – banks act as both collection and paying agents for customers, participating in interbank clearing and settlement systems to collect, present, be presented with, and pay payment instruments. This enables banks to economize on reserves held for settlement of payments since inward and outward payments offset each other. It also enables the offsetting of payment flows between geographical areas, reducing the cost of settlement between them.
3. Credit quality improvement – banks lend money to ordinary commercial and personal borrowers (ordinary credit quality), but are high quality borrowers. The improvement comes from diversification of the bank's assets and capital which provides a buffer to absorb losses without defaulting on its obligations. However, banknotes and deposits are generally unsecured; if the bank gets into difficulty and pledges assets as security, to raise the funding it needs to continue to operate, this puts the note holders and depositors in an economically subordinated position.
4. Asset–liability mismatch/Maturity transformation – banks borrow more on demand debt and short term debt, but provide more long-term loans. In other words, they borrow short and lend long. With a stronger credit quality than most other borrowers, banks can do this by aggregating issues (e.g. accepting deposits and issuing banknotes) and redemptions (e.g. withdrawals and redemption of banknotes), maintaining reserves of cash, investing in marketable securities that can be readily converted to cash if needed, and raising replacement funding as needed from various sources (e.g. wholesale cash markets and securities markets).
5. Money creation/destruction – whenever a bank gives out a loan in a fractional-reserve banking system, a new sum of money is created and conversely, whenever the principal on that loan is repaid money is destroyed.

== Bank crisis ==
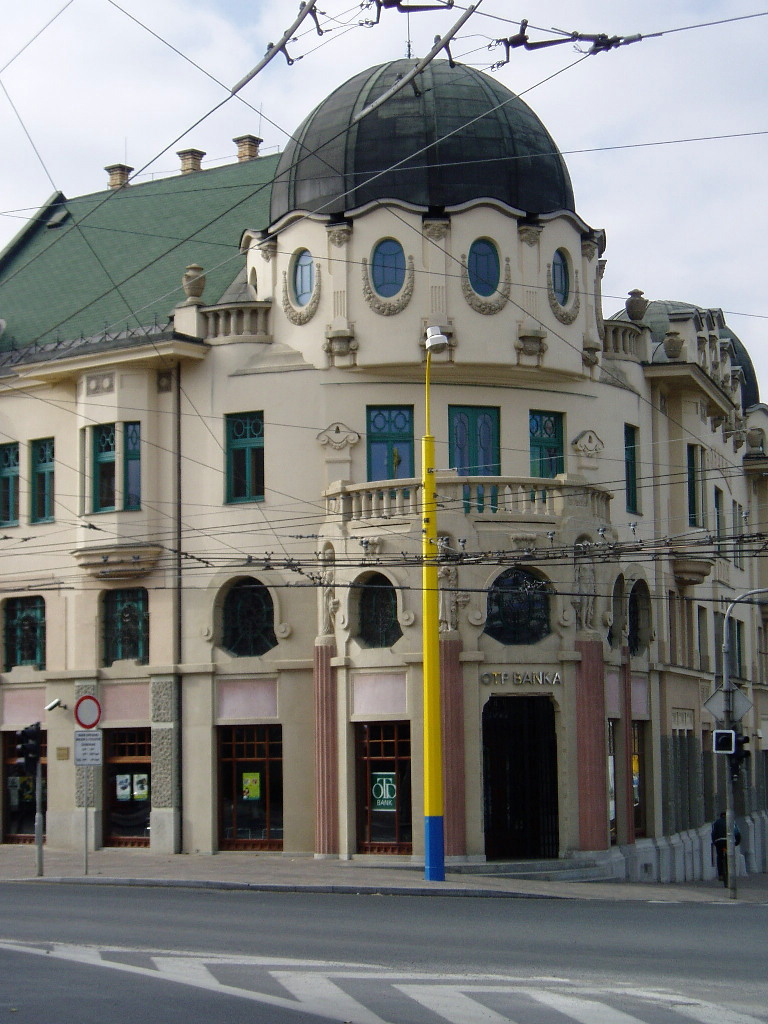
OTP Bank in Prešov (Slovakia)

Banks are susceptible to many forms of risk which have triggered occasional systemic crises. These include liquidity risk (where many depositors request withdrawals in excess of available funds), credit risk (the chance that those who owe money to the bank will not repay it), and interest rate risk (the possibility that the bank will become unprofitable, if rising interest rates force it to pay relatively more on its deposits than it receives on its loans).

Bank crises have developed many times throughout history when one or more risks have emerged for the banking sector as a whole. Prominent examples include the bank run that occurred during the Great Depression, the U.S. Savings and Loan crisis in the 1980s and early 1990s, the Japanese banking crisis during the 1990s, and the sub-prime mortgage crisis in the 2000s.

The 2023 global banking crisis is the latest of these crises: In March 2023, liquidity shortages and bank insolvencies led to three bank failures in the United States, and within two weeks, several of the world's largest banks failed or were shut down by regulators.

=== Size of global banking industry ===
Assets of the largest 1,000 banks in the world grew by 6.8% in the 2008–2009 financial year to a record US$96.4 trillion while profits declined by 85% to US$115 billion. Growth in assets in adverse market conditions was largely a result of recapitalization. EU banks held the largest share of the total, 56% in 2008–2009, down from 61% in the previous year. Asian banks' share increased from 12% to 14% during the year, while the share of US banks increased from 11% to 13%. Fee revenue generated by global investment in banking totaled US$66.3 billion in 2009, up 12% on the previous year.

The United States has the most banks in the world in terms of institutions (5,330 as of 2015) and possibly branches (81,607 as of 2015). This is an indicator of the geography and regulatory structure of the US, resulting in a large number of small to medium-sized institutions in its banking system.

As of November 2009, China's top four banks have over 67,000 branches (ICBC:18000+, BOC:12000+, CCB:13000+, ABC:24000+) with 140 smaller banks with an undetermined number of branches. Japan had 129 banks and 12,000 branches. In 2004, Germany, France, and Italy each had more than 30,000 branches – more than double the 15,000 branches in the United Kingdom.

=== Mergers and acquisitions ===
Between 1985 and 2018 banks engaged in around 28,798 mergers or acquisitions, either as the acquirer or the target company. The overall known value of these deals accumulates to around 5,169 bil. USD. In terms of value, there have been two major waves (1999 and 2007) which both peaked at around 460 bil. USD followed by a steep decline (−82% from 2007 until 2018).

Here is a list of the largest deals in history in terms of value with participation from at least one bank:

Date announced	Acquiring institution			Target institution			Value of transaction ($ millions)
Date announced	Name	Mid industry	Nation	Name	Mid industry	Nation	Value of transaction ($ millions)
2007-04-25	RFS Holdings BV	Other financials	Netherlands	ABN-AMRO Holding N.V.	Banks	Netherlands	98,189.19
1998-04-06	Travelers Group Inc	Insurance	United States	Citicorp	Banks	United States	72,558.18
2014-09-29	UBS AG	Banks	Switzerland	UBS AG	Banks	Switzerland	65,891.51
1998-04-13	NationsBank Corp, Charlotte, North Carolina	Banks	United States	Bank of America	Banks	United States	61,633.40
2004-01-14	JPMorgan Chase & Co	Banks	United States	Bank One Corp, Chicago, Illinois	Banks	United States	58,663.15
2003-10-27	Bank of America Corp	Banks	United States	FleetBoston Financial Corp, Massachusetts	Banks	United States	49,260.63
2008-09-14	Bank of America Corp	Banks	United States	Merrill Lynch & Co Inc	Brokerage	United States	48,766.15
1999-10-13	Sumitomo Bank Ltd	Banks	Japan	Sakura Bank Ltd	Banks	Japan	45,494.36
2009-02-26	HM Treasury	National agency	United Kingdom	Royal Bank of Scotland Group	Banks	United Kingdom	41,878.65
2005-02-18	Mitsubishi Tokyo Financial Group	Banks	Japan	UFJ Holdings Inc	Banks	Japan	41,431.03

== Regulation ==
Currently, commercial banks are regulated in most jurisdictions by government entities and require a special bank license to operate.

Usually, the definition of the business of banking for the purposes of regulation is extended to include acceptance of deposits, even if they are not repayable to the customer's order – although money lending, by itself, is generally not included in the definition.

Unlike most other regulated industries, the regulator is typically also a participant in the market, being either publicly or privately governed central bank. Central banks also typically have a monopoly on the business of issuing banknotes. However, in some countries, this is not the case. In the UK, for example, the Prudential Regulation Authority licenses banks, and some commercial banks (such as the Bank of Scotland) issue their own banknotes in addition to those issued by the Bank of England, the UK government's central bank.

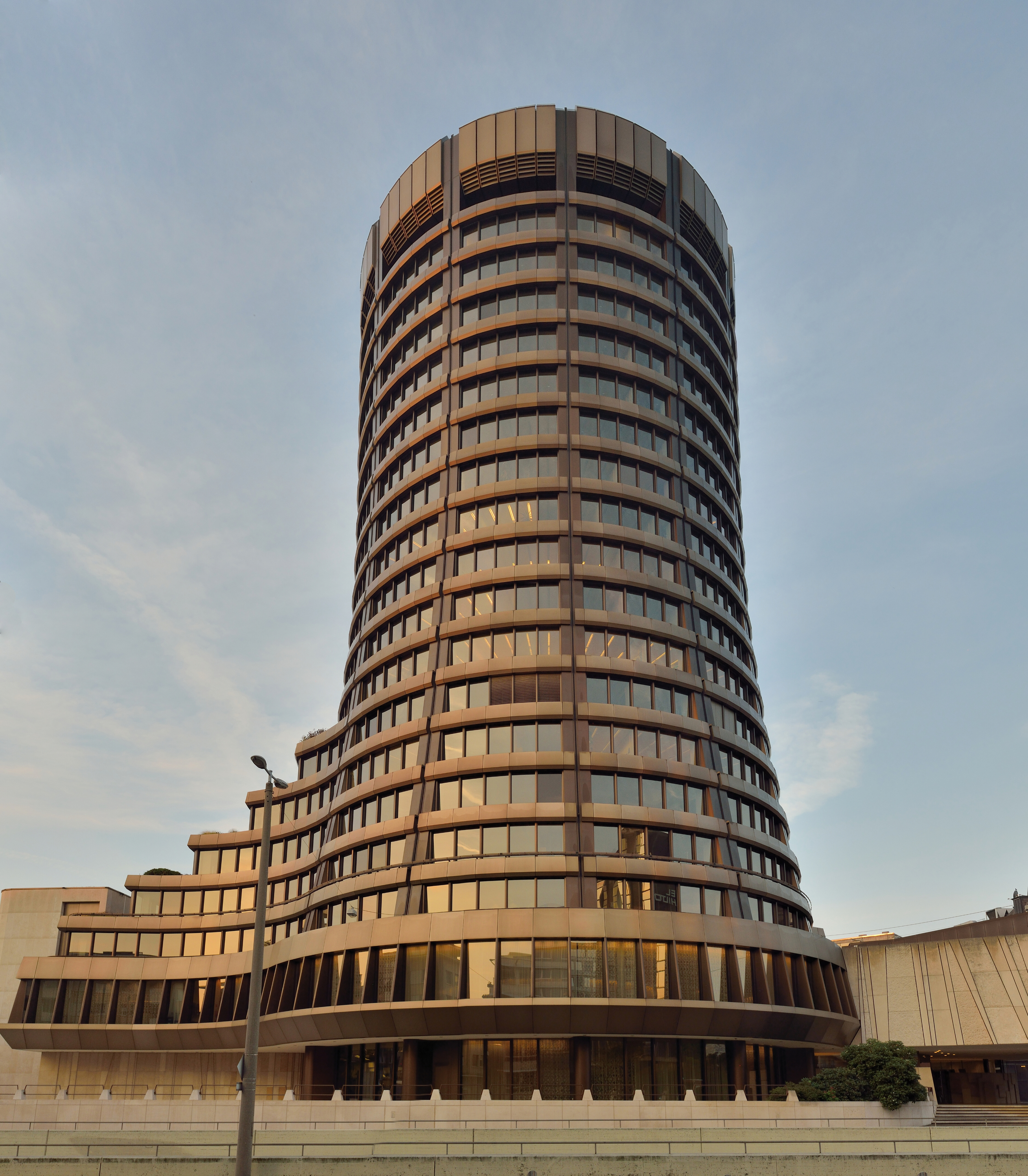
Global headquarters of the Bank for International Settlements in Basel

Banking law is based on a contractual analysis of the relationship between the bank (defined above) and the customer – defined as any entity for which the bank agrees to conduct an account.

The law implies rights and obligations into this relationship as follows:

- The bank account balance is the financial position between the bank and the customer: when the account is in credit, the bank owes the balance to the customer; when the account is overdrawn, the customer owes the balance to the bank.
- The bank agrees to pay the customer's checks up to the amount standing to the credit of the customer's account, plus any agreed overdraft limit.
- The bank may not pay from the customer's account without a mandate from the customer, e.g. a check drawn by the customer.
- The bank agrees to promptly collect the checks deposited to the customer's account as the customer's agent and to credit the proceeds to the customer's account.
- And, the bank has a right to combine the customer's accounts since each account is just an aspect of the same credit relationship.
- The bank has a lien on checks deposited to the customer's account, to the extent that the customer is indebted to the bank.
- The bank must not disclose details of transactions through the customer's account – unless the customer consents, there is a public duty to disclose, the bank's interests require it, or the law demands it.
- The bank must not debank a customer without reasonable notice as regulation demands.

These implied contractual terms may be modified by express agreement between the customer and the bank. The statutes and regulations in force within a particular jurisdiction may also modify the above terms or create new rights, obligations, or limitations relevant to the bank-customer relationship.

Some types of financial institutions, such as building societies and credit unions, may be partly or wholly exempt from bank license requirements, and therefore regulated under separate rules.

The requirements for the issue of a bank license vary between jurisdictions but typically include:

- Minimum capital
- Minimum capital ratio
- 'Fit and Proper' requirements for the bank's controllers, owners, directors, or senior officers
- Approval of the bank's business plan as being sufficiently prudent and plausible.

Bank lobbying can result in regulations beneficial to banks.

== Different types of banking ==
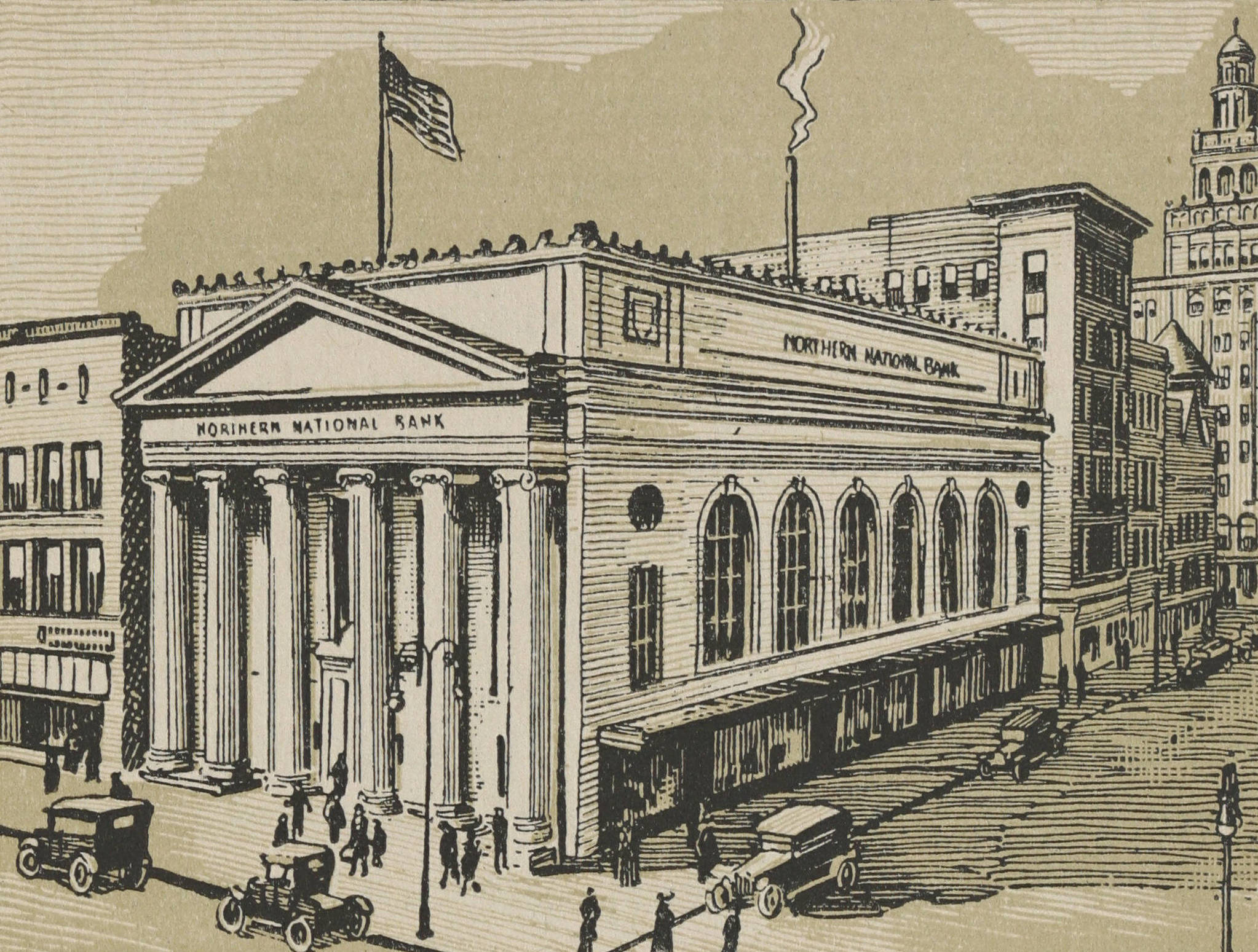
An illustration of Northern National Bank as advertized in a 1921 book highlighting the opportunities available in Toledo, Ohio

Banks' activities can be divided into:

- retail banking, dealing directly with individuals and small businesses;
- business banking, providing services to mid-market business;
- corporate banking, directed at large business entities;
- private banking, providing wealth management services to high-net-worth individuals and families;
- investment banking, relating to activities on the financial markets.

Most banks are profitmaking private enterprises. However, some are owned by the government, or are nonprofits.

=== Types of banks ===
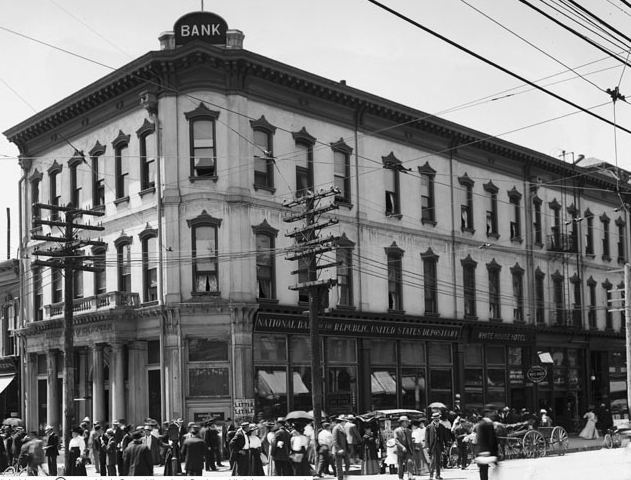
National Bank of the Republic, Salt Lake City 1908

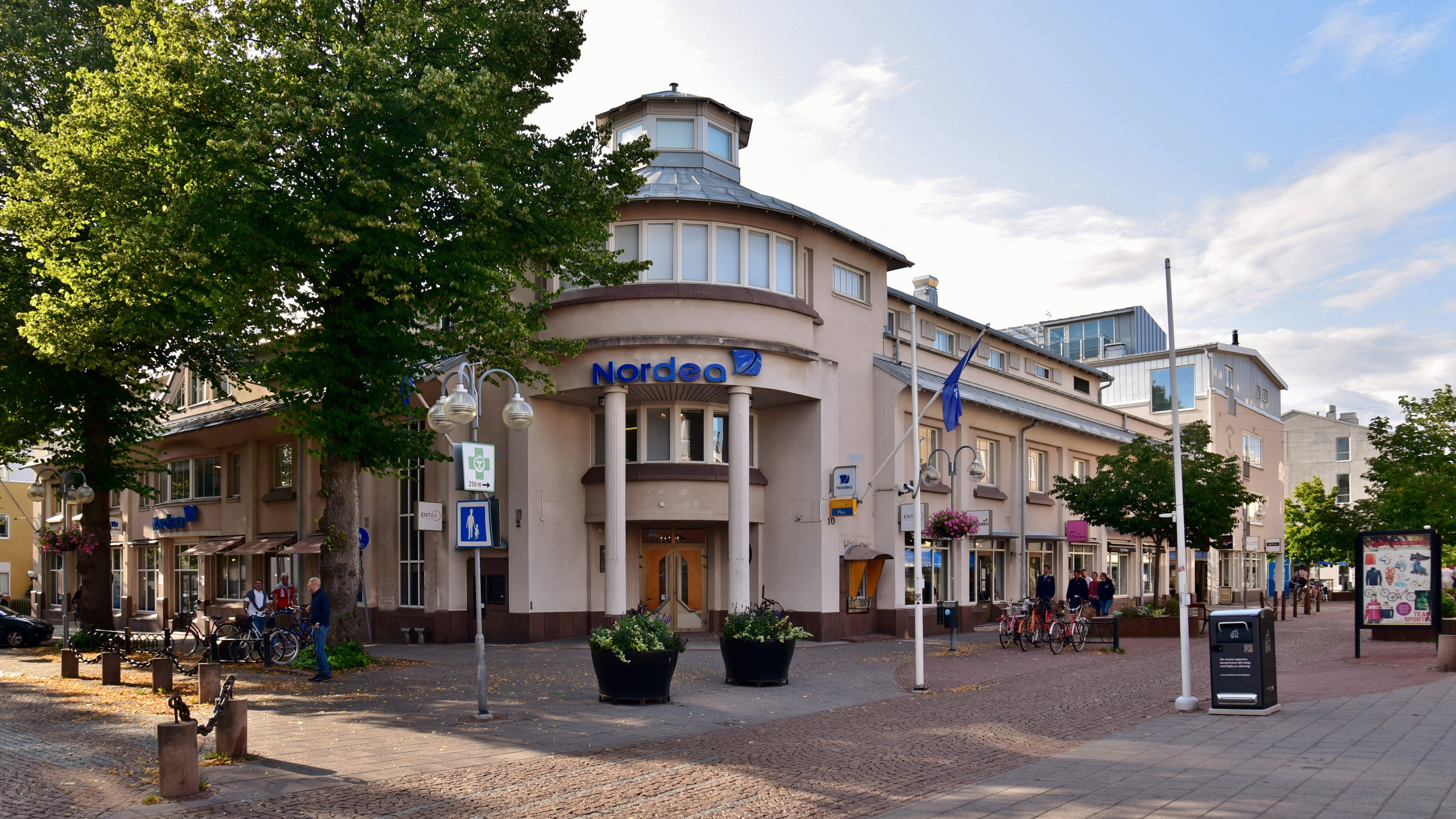
An office of Nordea bank in Mariehamn, Åland

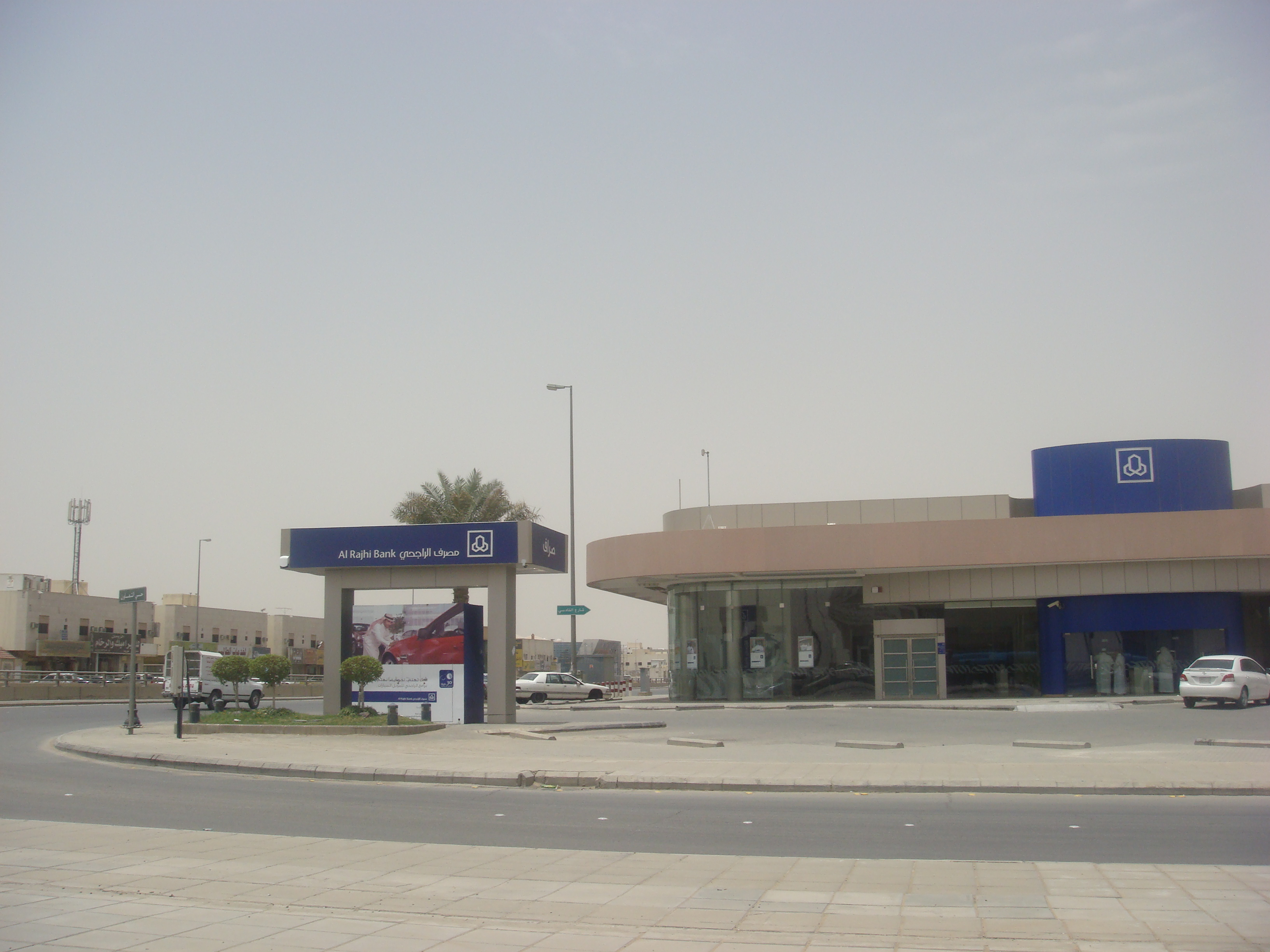
ATM Al-Rajhi Bank

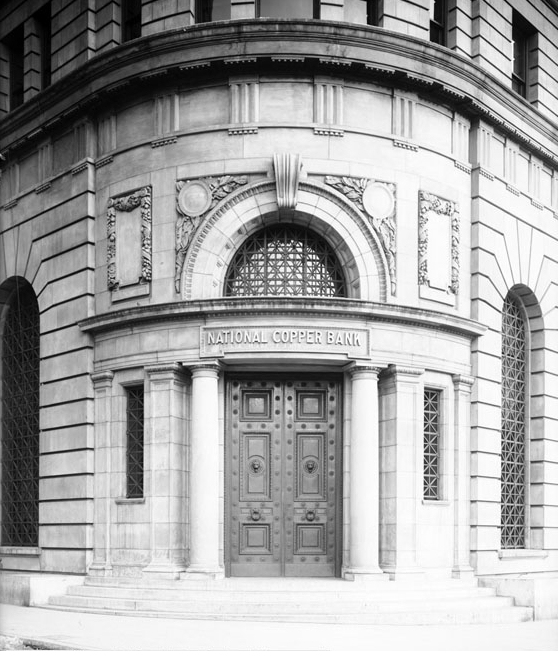
National Copper Bank, Salt Lake City 1911

- Commercial banks: the term used for a normal bank to distinguish it from an investment bank. After the Great Depression, the U.S. Congress required that banks only engage in banking activities, whereas investment banks were limited to capital market activities. Since the two no longer have to be under separate ownership, some use the term "commercial bank" to refer to a bank or a division of a bank that mostly deals with deposits and loans from corporations or large businesses.
- Community banks: locally operated financial institutions that empower employees to make local decisions to serve their customers and partners.
- Community development banks: regulated banks that provide financial services and credit to under-served markets or populations.
- Land development banks: The special banks providing long-term loans are called land development banks (LDB). The history of LDB is quite old. The first LDB was started at Jhang in Punjab in 1920. The main objective of the LDBs is to promote the development of land, agriculture and increase the agricultural production. The LDBs provide long-term finance to members directly through their branches.
- Credit unions or co-operative banks: not-for-profit cooperatives owned by the depositors and often offering rates more favorable than for-profit banks. Typically, membership is restricted to employees of a particular company, residents of a defined area, members of a certain union or religious organizations, and their immediate families.
- Postal savings banks: savings banks associated with national postal systems.
- Private banks: banks that manage the assets of high-net-worth individuals. Historically a minimum of US$1 million was required to open an account, however, over the last years, many private banks have lowered their entry hurdles to US$350,000 for private investors.
- Offshore banks: banks located in jurisdictions with low taxation and regulation. Many offshore banks are essentially private banks.
- Savings banks: in Europe, savings banks took their roots in the 19th or sometimes even in the 18th century. Their original objective was to provide easily accessible savings products to all strata of the population. In some countries, savings banks were created on public initiative; in others, socially committed individuals created foundations to put in place the necessary infrastructure. Nowadays, European savings banks have kept their focus on retail banking: payments, savings products, credits, and insurances for individuals or small and medium-sized enterprises. Apart from this retail focus, they also differ from commercial banks by their broadly decentralized distribution network, providing local and regional outreach – and by their socially responsible approach to business and society.
- Ethical banks: banks that prioritize the transparency of all operations and make only what they consider to be socially responsible investments.
- A direct or internet-only bank is a banking operation without any physical bank branches. Transactions are usually accomplished using ATMs and electronic transfers and direct deposits through an online interface.
- Informal banks: banking operations that operate entirely outside of traditional formal banking institutions. Common in many rural communities, these financial services rely on trust, personal networks or community groups rather than contracts, collateral or government oversight. While these services such as local moneylenders, peer-to-peer lending circles, and value transfer systems such as Hawala offer fast, accessible, and culturally aligned financing, they carry significant risks such as high interest rates and lack of legal protection.

=== Types of investment banks ===
- Investment banks "underwrite" (guarantee the sale of) stock and bond issues, provide investment management, and advise corporations on capital market activities such as M&A, trade for their own accounts, make markets, provide securities services to institutional clients.
- Merchant banks were traditionally banks which engaged in trade finance. The modern definition, however, refers to banks which provide capital to firms in the form of shares rather than loans. Unlike venture caps, they tend not to invest in new companies.

=== Combination banks ===
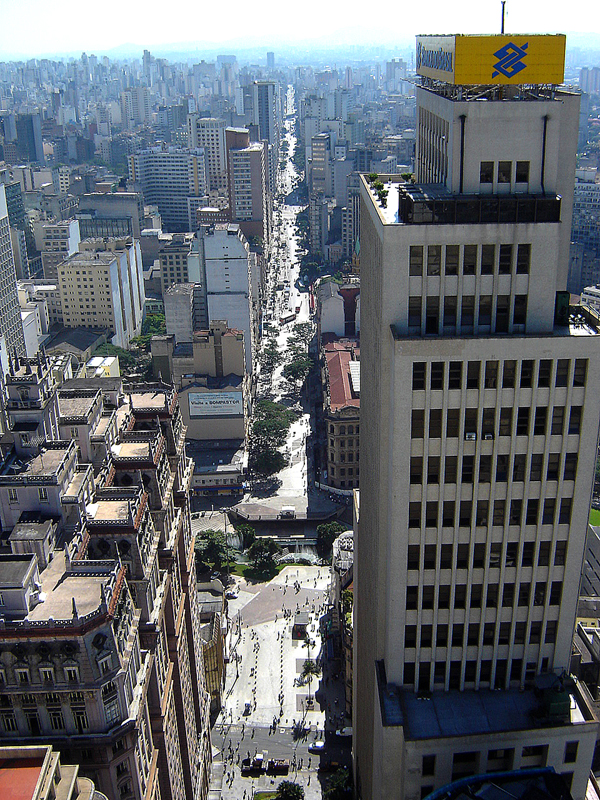
A Banco do Brasil office in São Paulo, Brazil, the bank is the largest financial institution in Brazil and Latin America.

- Universal banks, more commonly known as financial services companies, engage in several of these activities. These big banks are very diversified groups that, among other services, also distribute insurance – hence the term bancassurance, a portmanteau combining "banque or bank" and "assurance", signifying that both banking and insurance are provided by the same corporate entity.

=== Other types of banks ===
- Central banks are normally government-owned and charged with quasi-regulatory responsibilities, such as supervising commercial banks, or controlling the cash interest rate. They generally provide liquidity to the banking system and act as the lender of last resort in event of a crisis.
- Islamic banks adhere to the concepts of Islamic law. This form of banking revolves around several well-established principles based on Islamic laws. All banking activities must avoid interest, a concept that is forbidden in Islam. Instead, the bank earns profit (markup) and fees on the financing facilities that it extends to customers.

== Challenges within the banking industry ==
=== In the United States ===
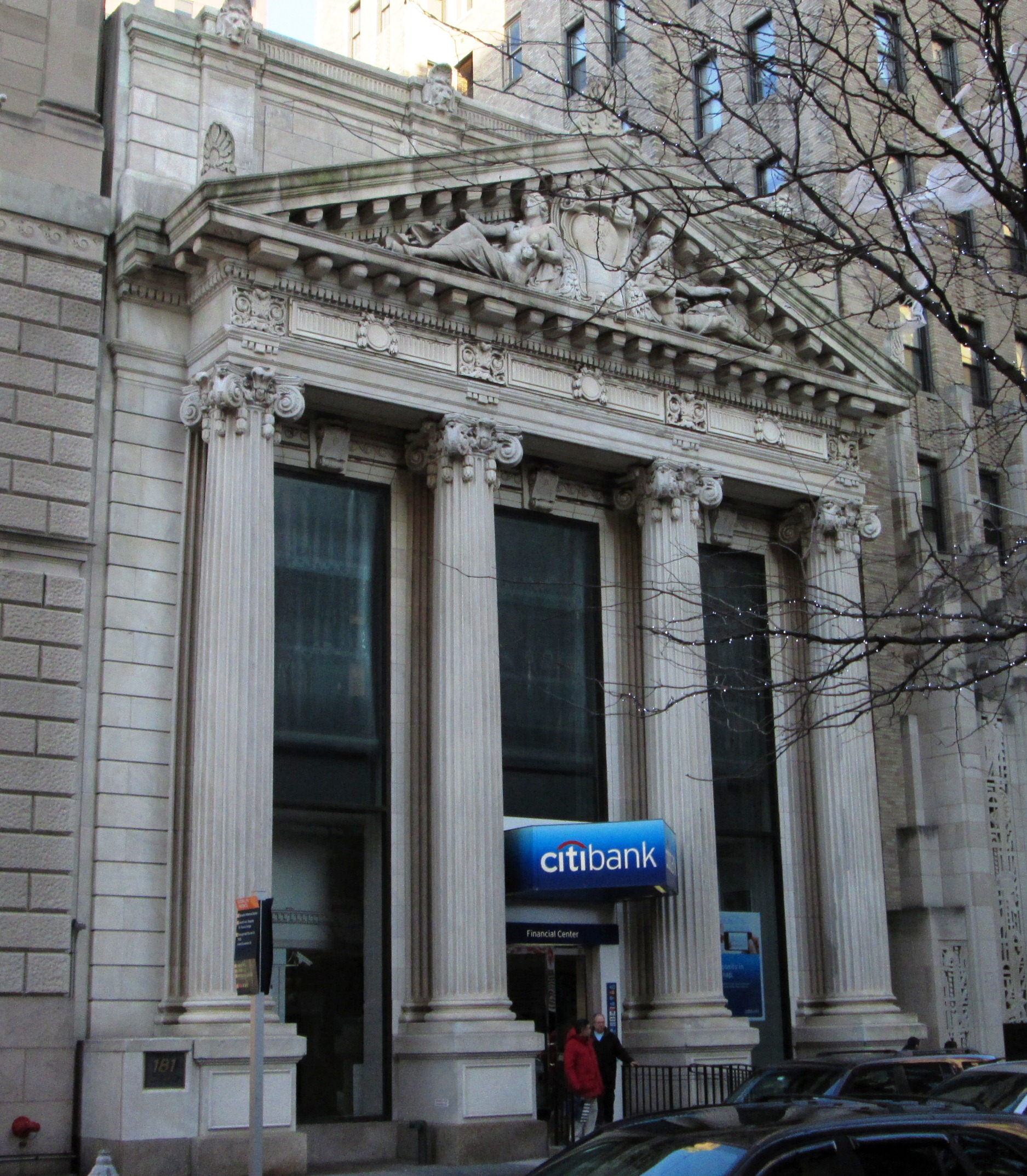
Citibank, The People's Trust Company Building, Brooklyn, New York City.

The United States banking industry is one of the most heavily regulated and guarded in the world, with multiple specialized and focused regulators. All banks with FDIC-insured deposits have the Federal Deposit Insurance Corporation (FDIC) as a regulator. However, for soundness examinations (i.e., whether a bank is operating in a sound manner), the Federal Reserve is the primary federal regulator for Fed-member state banks; the Office of the Comptroller of the Currency (OCC) is the primary federal regulator for national banks. State non-member banks are examined by the state agencies as well as the FDIC. National banks have one primary regulator – the OCC.

Each regulatory agency has its own set of rules and regulations to which banks and thrifts must adhere. The Federal Financial Institutions Examination Council (FFIEC) was established in 1979 as a formal inter-agency body empowered to prescribe uniform principles, standards, and report forms for the federal examination of financial institutions. Although the FFIEC has resulted in a greater degree of regulatory consistency between the agencies, the rules and regulations are constantly changing.

In addition to changing regulations, changes in the industry have led to consolidations within the Federal Reserve, FDIC, OTS, and OCC. Offices have been closed, supervisory regions have been merged, staff levels have been reduced and budgets have been cut. The remaining regulators face an increased burden with an increased workload and more banks per regulator. While banks struggle to keep up with the changes in the regulatory environment, regulators struggle to manage their workload and effectively regulate their banks. The impact of these changes is that banks are receiving less hands-on assessment by the regulators, less time spent with each institution, and the potential for more problems slipping through the cracks, potentially resulting in an overall increase in bank failures across the United States.

The changing economic environment has a significant impact on banks and thrifts as they struggle to effectively manage their interest rate spread in the face of low rates on loans, rate competition for deposits and the general market changes, industry trends and economic fluctuations. It has been a challenge for banks to effectively set their growth strategies with the recent economic market. A rising interest rate environment may seem to help financial institutions, but the effect of the changes on consumers and businesses is not predictable and the challenge remains for banks to grow and effectively manage the spread to generate a return to their shareholders.

The management of the banks' asset portfolios also remains a challenge in today's economic environment. Loans are a bank's primary asset category and when loan quality becomes suspect, the foundation of a bank is shaken to the core. While always an issue for banks, declining asset quality has become a big problem for financial institutions.

There are several reasons for this, one of which is the lax attitude some banks have adopted because of the years of "good times." The potential for this is exacerbated by the reduction in the regulatory oversight of banks and in some cases depth of management. Problems are more likely to go undetected, resulting in a significant impact on the bank when they are discovered. In addition, banks, like any business, struggle to cut costs and have consequently eliminated certain expenses, such as adequate employee training programs.

Banks also face a host of other challenges such as aging ownership groups. Across the country, many banks' management teams and boards of directors are aging. Banks also face ongoing pressure from shareholders, both public and private, to achieve earnings and growth projections. Regulators place added pressure on banks to manage the various categories of risk. Another major challenge is the aging infrastructure, also called legacy IT. Backend systems were built decades ago and are incompatible with new applications. Fixing bugs and creating interfaces costs huge sums, as knowledgeable programmers become scarce.

=== Competition ===
Competition between banks varies by country and can range from a competitive market to oligopoly. Competitiveness of the banking market can be estimated with the Lerner index and Boone indicator. Higher competition between banks tends to increase interest rates on savings accounts and reduces mortgage rates.

=== Loan activities of banks ===
The phenomenon of disintermediation had to dollars moving from savings accounts into direct market instruments such as U.S. Department of Treasury obligations, agency securities, and corporate debt. One of the greatest factors in recent years in the movement of deposits was the tremendous growth of money market funds whose higher interest rates attracted consumer deposits.

Banking institutions offer many different types of plans:

- Passbook or ordinary deposit accounts – permit any amount to be added to or withdrawn from the account at any time.
- NOW and Super NOW accounts - function like checking accounts but earn interest. A minimum balance may be required on Super NOW accounts.
- Money market accounts - carry a monthly limit of preauthorized transfers to other accounts or persons and may require a minimum or average balance.
- Certificate accounts – subject to loss of some or all interest on withdrawals before maturity.
- Notice accounts – the equivalent of certificate accounts with an indefinite term. Savers agree to notify the institution a specified time before withdrawal.
- Individual retirement accounts (IRAs) and Keogh plans – a form of retirement savings in which the funds deposited and interest earned are exempt from income tax until after withdrawal.
- Checking accounts – offered by some institutions under definite restrictions.
- All withdrawals and deposits are completely the sole decision and responsibility of the account owner unless the parent or guardian is required to do otherwise for legal reasons.
- Club accounts and other savings accounts – designed to help people save regularly to meet certain goals.

=== Investment for the fossil fuel industry ===
Even after The Paris Agreement has entered into force, large banks in developed countries are heavily financing the fossil fuel industry. This practice has been condemned as going against climate action.

== Types of accounts ==
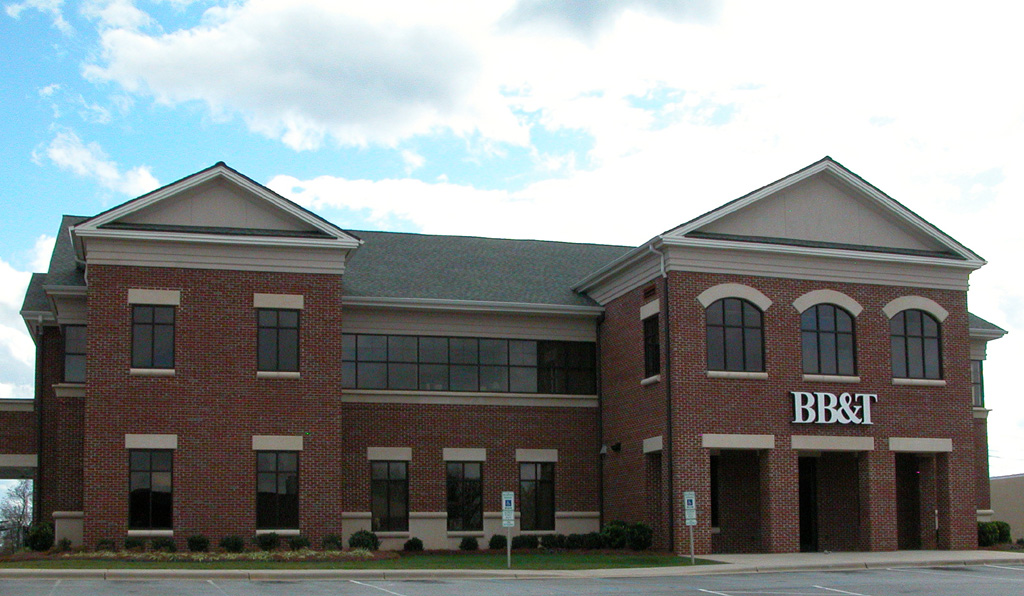
Suburban bank branch

Bank statements are accounting records produced by banks under the various accounting standards of the world. Under GAAP there are two kinds of accounts: debit and credit. Credit accounts are Revenue, Equity and Liabilities. Debit Accounts are Assets and Expenses. The bank credits a credit account to increase its balance, and debits a credit account to decrease its balance.

The customer debits his or her savings/bank (asset) in his ledger when making a deposit (and the account is normally in debit), while the customer credits a credit card (liability) account in his ledger every time he spends money (and the account is normally in credit). When the customer reads his bank statement, the statement will show a credit to the account for deposits, and debits for withdrawals of funds. The customer with a positive balance will see this balance reflected as a credit balance on the bank statement. If the customer is overdrawn, he will have a negative balance, reflected as a debit balance on the bank statement.

=== Brokered deposits ===
One source of deposits for banks is deposit brokers who deposit large sums of money on behalf of investors through trust corporations. This money will generally go to the banks which offer the most favorable terms, often better than those offered local depositors. It is possible for a bank to engage in business with no local deposits at all, all funds being brokered deposits. Accepting a significant quantity of such deposits, or "hot money" as it is sometimes called, puts a bank in a difficult and sometimes risky position, as the funds must be lent or invested in a way that yields a return sufficient to pay the high interest being paid on the brokered deposits. This may result in risky decisions and even in eventual failure of the bank. Banks that failed in the United States during the 2008 financial crisis had, on average, four times more brokered deposits as a percent of their deposits than the average bank. Such deposits, combined with risky real estate investments, factored into the savings and loan crisis of the 1980s. Regulation of brokered deposits is opposed by banks on the grounds that the practice can be a source of external funding to growing communities with insufficient local deposits. There are different types of accounts: saving, recurring and current accounts.

=== Custodial accounts ===
Custodial accounts are accounts in which assets are held for a third party. For example, businesses that accept custody of funds for clients prior to their conversion, return, or transfer may have a custodial account at a bank for these purposes.

== Globalization ==
In modern times there have been huge reductions to the barriers of global competition in the banking industry. Increases in telecommunications and other financial technologies, such as Bloomberg, have allowed banks to extend their reach all over the world since they no longer have to be near customers to manage both their finances and their risk. The growth in cross-border activities has also increased the demand for banks that can provide various services across borders to different nationalities. Despite these reductions in barriers and growth in cross-border activities, the banking industry is nowhere near as globalized as some other industries. In the US, for instance, very few banks even worry about the Riegle–Neal Act, which promotes more efficient interstate banking. In the vast majority of nations around the globe, the market share for foreign owned banks is currently less than a tenth of all market shares for banks in a particular nation. One reason the banking industry has not been fully globalized is that it is more convenient to have local banks provide loans to small businesses and individuals. On the other hand, for large corporations, it is not as important in what nation the bank is in since the corporation's financial information is available around the globe.

There have been two significant attempts to overcome the industry's traditional focus on competing at the national level rather than the international level. In the 1980s, Citigroup and HSBC both began to develop large networks of retail bank branches in numerous countries around the world, in order to become global consumer banking brands. But in 2021, Citigroup initiated an exit from retail banking outside of its core U.S. market, while in 2022, HSBC initiated an exit from the U.S. retail market (except for its wealth management business) and then in 2023 put its retail operations in a dozen other countries under review for sale or closure. According to Wells Fargo, both banks were operating on the assumption that globalization would lead to the rise of large numbers of consumers who would regularly travel across borders for both work and play, but that "global consumer customer never materialized".

== See also ==
- List of banks
- List of largest banks – Largest commercial banks by total assets and market capitalization
- Narrow banking – Offering of services by a financial institution holding exclusively government bonds
- Overdraft – Payments from a bank account exceeding the balance
- Overdraft protection – Payments from a bank account exceeding the balance
- Venture capital – Form of private-equity financing
- Public bank – State-owned or noncommercial financial institution
- Savings and loan association – Type of financial institution
- Savings bank – Financial institution focused on savings deposits
- List of major stock exchanges
