= GRG =

GRG or variant thereof, may refer to:

- Gerontology Research Group (GRG), American social sciences research group
- GRG Banking, a Chinese corporation manufacturing ATMs
- Global Restructuring Group of Royal Bank of Scotland
- GrG, the astronomical abbreviation for group of galaxies
- grg, the ISO:639 language code for the Gira language
- Gathorne Robert Girdlestone (1881–1950), British surgeon
- GRG Matriculation Higher Secondary School, in Coimbatore, Tamil Nadu, India
- Georges River Grammar School, in Georges River, New South Wales
- Grogol railway station, in Jakarta, Indonesia
