= GRG Banking =

Chinese financial hardware company

- Type: Public
- Traded as: SZSE: 002152
- Industry: Information technology
- Founded: 1999
- Headquarters: Guangzhou, China
- Key people: Yuezhen Huang (Chairman of the board of Directors)
- Products: ATM and other banking solutions
- Number of employees: 26,000+
- Website: https://global.grgbanking.com

GRG Banking is a Chinese listed enterprise, specialized in the financial self-service industry. GRG Banking is engaged in research and development, manufacturing, sales and service, software development for automated teller machines (ATMs), automated fare collection systems (AFCs), and other currency recognition and processing equipment.

== History ==
GRG Banking is a subsidiary of Guangzhou Radio Group (GRG) that was established in 1957. The Guangzhou Radio Group is an organization that supplies communication solutions. GRG Banking's predecessor was Guangzhou Yun Tong Technology Engineering Limited, which was founded in 1989. It was the first domestic ATM equipment manufacturer in China. In 1999, GRG invested in the financial electronics field and set up an independent innovation high-tech enterprise, GRG Banking, which began producing ATM of its own intellectual property rights.

In 2010, GRG gained control of the largest cash recycling contract in Turkey to date. That November, GRG Banking founded the GRG R&D Academy, which was the first Chinese ATM R&D Academy. GRG's market share in the Chinese ATM markets grew to 22%.

In April 2013, GRG banking passed the certification of the French Groupement des Cartes Bancaires CB to be able to sell the DT7000H22Nx and DT7000H68Nx ATMs to the French market.

Reports indicate that GRG accounted for 27.85% of the Chinese ATM market in 2015. That same year, Forbes listed GRG on their "Asia's 200 Best Under A Billion" list. By February 2016, GRG Banking established itself as a provider of currency recognition and cash processing solutions. Later that year, the first ATM controlled by "Face+finger vein+iris" authentication technology was created by GRG.

In March 2020, the ATM Industry Association released a report showing GRG Banking ranked No.1 in the intelligent cash equipment market for 12 consecutive years as well as stands out from the large amount recycler market. The company also has advantages in maintenance service capability. In 2020, it was announced that GRG ranked No.1 in the intelligent branch terminal market for 13 consecutive years in China. GRG held a fully online Global Customer Exchange event, which had 1,000 attendees spanning across 100 countries.

In the United States, GRG Banking has established a long-term partnership with several key local partners since 2009. GRG International is one of the most longtime partners whose distributor includes Cummins Allison Corporation and others. In 2018, GRG Banking established its own subsidiary in Illinois to enhance the relationship with the local partners and better serve customers in that market.

== Products ==
=== Hardware ===
- Self-service hardware, ATMs
- Self-service hardware, Kiosks
- Self-service hardware, Ticket vending machines
- Self-service hardware, Video banking machines (VTM)

=== Services ===
- IT infrastructure services
- Managed services
- Payment
- Retail
- Self-service
