= Narrow banking =

Offering of services by a financial institution holding exclusively government bonds

Narrow banking is a banking system that restricts commercial banks to hold only safe and liquid assets, like government bonds, against customer deposits, while prohibiting traditional lending activities. Under this model, banks function as custodians and payment processors, separate from the lending function performed by other financial intermediaries. The concept emerged as a response to banking instability and gained attention following financial crises, though there is limited implementation.

Narrow banking fundamentally differs from current fractional-reserve practice by eliminating maturity and credit risk. Proponents argue this enhances financial stability and reduces systemic risk, while critics claim it could reduce credit availability to the economy.

Narrow banking is undergoing a resurgence, with trust in the fractional system eroding as new payments systems, such as stablecoins, are emerging.

== Concept and structure ==
Narrow banks' business model differs from traditional commercial banks. Instead of borrowing short-term deposits to make long-term loans, narrow banks would back demand deposits with 100% central bank reserves or short-term government securities.

Key characteristics include:

Asset restrictions: Banks would be restricted to holding safe assets like government bonds.

Functional separation: Deposit taking and payment functions would be separated from lending, which would be funded through uninsured deposits and capital. Money market funds might become an important source of finance for households and develop expertise in originating credit.

Fee-based revenue model: Since narrow banks cannot earn income from lending, they would be fee-driven.

Narrow banking contrasts with full-reserve banking, which typically allows banks to make loans using equity capital or time deposits, while backing demand deposits with 100% reserves.

== Theoretical foundation ==
The case for narrow banking draws from financial stability concerns. Proponents argue the inherent instability of fractional-reserve banking arises from the conflict between the promise to convert deposits to cash on demand and the practice of lending most deposited funds.

Banking fragility theory suggests traditional banks are inherently vulnerable to bank runs because of self-fulfilling market concerns about bank liquidity adequacy. Narrow banking would eliminate this fragility by always having liquid assets to meet withdrawal demands.

Risk separation could reduce the need for deposit insurance. Separating the payment system from credit risk protects from losses in lending activities.

Monetary policy could more effective as central banks improve their ability to directly control the money supply process, rather than being influenced by private bank lending.

== Historical development ==
Early monetary economists laid the intellectual foundations, with the modern concept emerging in response to financial instability and banking crises.

Early influences include Irving Fisher's Great Depression reform proposals and Milton Friedman, who advocated for 100% reserve banking to minimize bank failure risk.

Contemporary development began in the 1980s savings and loan crisis, amidst questions of fractional-reserve stability. Academic work by economists John Kay, Laurence Kotlikoff, and others provided frameworks for narrow banking proposals.

Post-2008 revival saw movement towards narrow banking with the Federal Reserve paying interest on reserves. The crisis showed the systemic risk of banks' combined deposits and lending. Academic research and policy discussion about fundamental banking reform increased.

== Arguments in favor ==
Narrow banking proponents make several arguments for fundamentally restructuring the banking system:

Financial stability would be improved since narrow banks would be immune to traditional bank runs. Removing risk of default and interest rate changes would reduce the need for deposit insurance.

Market discipline would apply to separate lending organizations since they would not be insured by the government.

Reduced moral hazard would result from removing deposit insurance for lending activities.

Payment system stability would be enhanced by narrow banks' risk-free balance sheets. Depositors could be confident in deposit availability without taxpayer risk.

== Criticisms and concerns ==
Critics of narrow banking raise several significant objections to the proposal:

Credit availability concerns focus on whether specialized lending would adequately replace bank lending. Critics argue removing bank lending could reduce credit availability for small businesses and consumers.

Economic efficiency questions center on economies of scope and whether separation of functions would limit income stability of banks.

Implementation challenges include restructuring to separate existing bank functions and the possibility of regulatory arbitrage as financial institutions adapt to supervision.

Procyclical effects concern some critics who worry savers will shift cash to the protected sector when economic conditions worsen.

== Regulatory response ==
United States regulatory stance became clear in 2019 when the Federal Reserve denied the TNB USA Inc. application to create a narrow bank, citing the potential for narrow banks to "complicate the implementation of monetary policy," drain deposits from traditional banks, and affect the broader financial system's liquidity.

Ongoing regulatory debate continues among policymakers and academics on whether regulatory frameworks adequately address narrow banking. Some argue for a regulatory sandbox for niche banks.

== Historical examples ==
In the 17th century, the Bank of Amsterdam operated as 100% reserve.

The Mit Ghamr Savings Bank in Egypt ran from 1963-67. It neither charged nor paid interest but shared profit. Islamic banking and finance requires tying financial transactions to real assets.

In December 2025, N3XT inc launched the first narrow bank in the U.S.A. after receiving its Special Purpose Depository Institution charter from the State of Wyoming.

== See also ==
- Full-reserve banking
- Monetary reform
- Reserve requirement
- Positive Money
- Money market fund
