= Land development bank =

Special kind of development bank in India

A land development bank, abbreviated LDB, is a special kind of development bank in India. It is a quasi-commercial type that provides services such as accepting deposits, making business loans, and offering basic investment products. The main objective of the LDB is to promote the development of land, agriculture and increase the agricultural production. The LDB provides long-term finance to members directly through its branches.

Depending on their bye-laws or constitutions they provide different functions and structures. Some are organized on a state basis, some on a co-operative basis and some on a private basis, incorporating joint stock principles.

== History ==
The first Land Development Bank was started at Jhang in Punjab in 1920. However, real progress began when the land development bank was established in Chennai in 1929. Not only that, land banks, land mortgage banks, agriculture banks, agriculture development banks are now called land development banks in modern world.

== Sources of funds ==
The sources of funds of land development banks can include:

1. Share capital from state or private sources
2. Deposits from members or non-members
3. Issue of debentures
4. Accepting deposits
5. Reimbursements of subsidies from the government
6. Other funds

== Loans and advances ==
Land development banks provide long-term funds for various agriculture related projects besides development of land and business. The borrowing capacity of a member is generally determined according to the number of shares he holds in the bank. The loans granted by land development bank is typically repayable within a 20 to 30-year period. Normally, loans are granted up to 50% of the value of the land or up to 30 times the revenue. Loans are granted only after a thorough verification of security title-deeds as well as the necessity for the loan. The rates of interest for LT loans are generally low and within the paying capacity of farmers. They are around 11 to 12%.

== Notable LDBs ==
- Gujarat State Cooperative Agriculture and Rural Development Bank; see List of co-operative federations § India
- Progoti Co-operative Land Development Bank Limited
- National Co-operative Agriculture & Rural Development Banks Federation Limited
- Orissa Provincial Co-operative Land Mortgage Bank Limited
- Delta Land Development Limited
- Land and Agricultural Development Bank of South Africa
- Kerala State Co Operative Agricultural and Rural Development Bank (KSCARDB)
