= Video banking =

Video banking refers to banking transactions or professional banking consultations performed via a remote video connection. Video banking can be performed via purpose built banking transaction machines (similar to an automated teller machine), or via a videoconference enabled bank branch.

== Types of video banking ==
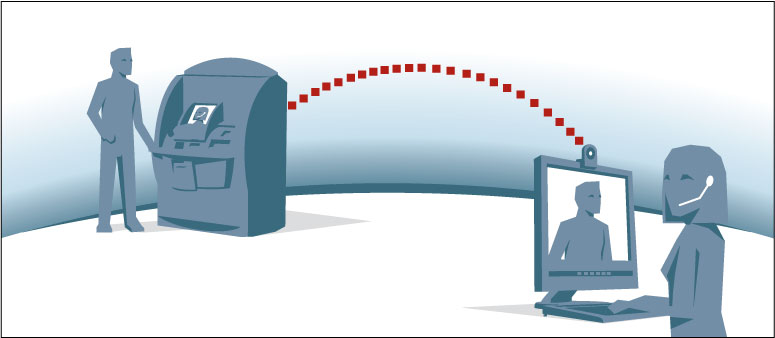
Graphical depiction of a video banking transaction system

=== In-branch ===
Video banking can be conducted in a traditional banking branch. This form of video banking replaces traditional banking tellers to a location outside of the main banking branch area, via the use of video and audio links. Customer use a purpose built machine in the branch to process viable medias such as cheques, cash, or coins.

Video banking can enable banks to expand the availability of banking consultations to branches that may not otherwise have staff with certain types of expertise.

=== Non-branch vestibules ===
Video banking can be provided during non-traditional branch banking hours, up to 24 hours a day, or in non-traditional banking locations such as grocery stores, office buildings, factories, or educational campuses. The Indian bank IndusInd Bank, for example, launched a service called Video Branch which allows customers to conduct virtual face-to-face banking with bank branch managers or a central video branch from any location.
