= Treaty of Paris =

Treaty of Paris may refer to one of many treaties signed in Paris, France:

== Treaties ==
=== 1200s and 1300s ===
- Treaty of Paris (1229), which ended the Albigensian Crusade
- Treaty of Paris (1259), between Henry III of England and Louis IX of France
- Treaty of Paris (1303), between King Philip IV of France and King Edward I of England
- Treaty of Paris (1320), peace between King Philip V of France and Robert III, Count of Flanders
- Treaty of Paris (1323), in which Count Louis of Flanders relinquished Flemish claims over Zeeland
- Treaty of Paris (1355), a land exchange between France and Savoy

=== 1500s to 1700s ===
- Treaty of Paris (1515), planning the marriage of the 15-year old future King Charles I of Spain and 4-year old Renée of France
- Treaty of Paris (1623), between France, Savoy, and Venice against Spanish forces in Valtelline
- Treaty of Paris (1626), peace between King Louis XIII and the Huguenots of La Rochelle
- Treaty of Paris (1657), established a military alliance between France and England against Spain
- Treaty of Paris (1718), between Philip of Orléans, Regent of France, and Leopold, Duke of Lorraine
- Treaty of Paris (1761), established the third Bourbon Family Compact between France and Spain
- Treaty of Paris (1763), ended the Seven Years' War
- Treaty of Paris (1783), ended the American Revolutionary War
- Treaty of Paris (1784), ended the Fourth Anglo-Dutch War
- Treaty of Paris (1796), ended the war between France and the Kingdom of Piedmont-Sardinia

=== 1800s ===
- Treaty of Paris (August 1801), ended the war between France and Bavaria
- Treaty of Paris (4 October 1801), the final peace treaty between Russia and Spain; see Treaty of Paris (8 October 1801)
- Treaty of Paris (8 October 1801), the final peace treaty between France and Russia
- Treaty of Paris (1802), ended the war between France and the Ottoman Empire
- Treaty of Paris (July 1806), creating the Confederation of the Rhine
- Treaty of Paris (1808), between France and Prussia
- Treaty of Paris (February 1810), between France and the Kingdom of Bavaria
- Treaty of Paris (1810), ended the war between France and Sweden
- Treaty of Paris (24 February 1812), established an alliance between France and Prussia against Russia
- Treaty of Paris (14 March 1812), established an alliance between France and Austria against Russia
- Treaty of Paris (1814), signed between France and the Sixth Coalition
- Treaty of Paris (1815), signed between France and the Seventh Coalition, following the defeat of Napoleon at Waterloo
- Treaty of Paris (1817), part of the Congress of Vienna
- Treaty of Paris (1856), ended the Crimean War
- Treaty of Paris (1857), ended the Anglo-Persian War
- Treaty of Paris (26 May 1857), ended the Neuchâtel Crisis
- Paris Convention for the Protection of Industrial Property (1883), one of the first intellectual property treaties
- Treaty of Paris (1898), ended the Spanish–American War

=== 1900s and 2000s ===
- Treaty of Paris (1900), ended all conflicting claims between France and Spain over Río Muni in Africa
- Paris Convention of 1919, the first international convention to address the political difficulties in international aerial navigation
- Treaty of Paris (1920), united Bessarabia and Romania
- Treaties of Paris that ended World War I (at the Paris Peace Conference (1919–1920)):
  - Treaty of Saint-Germain-en-Laye (1919), with Austria
  - Treaty of Neuilly-sur-Seine (1919), with Bulgaria
  - Treaty of Versailles (1919), with Germany
  - Treaty of Trianon (1920), with Hungary
  - Treaty of Sèvres (1920), with the Ottoman Empire
- Paris Peace Treaties, 1947, formally established peace between the World War II Allies and Bulgaria, Hungary, Italy, Romania and Finland
- Treaty of Paris (1951), established the European Coal and Steel Community
- Bonn–Paris conventions (1952), putting an end to the Allied occupation of West Germany
- Treaty establishing the European Defence Community (1952), an unratified treaty
- Paris Convention on Third Party Liability in the Field of Nuclear Energy (1960), liability and compensation for damage caused by accidents occurring while producing nuclear energy
- Paris Peace Accords (1973), ended American involvement in the Vietnam War
- Paris Charter (1990), helped form the Organization for Security and Co-operation in Europe
- 1991 Paris Peace Accords, marked the end of the Cambodian-Vietnamese War
- Dayton Agreement (1995, formally signed in Paris), ending the Bosnia War
- Paris Agreement (2015), an international agreement on climate change

== Other uses ==
- Treaty of Paris (band), pop-punk rock band from Chicago
- Treaty of Paris (painting), an unfinished 1783 painting by Benjamin West
- Treaty of Paris, the horse which won the 2013 Acomb Stakes

== See also ==
- List of Paris meetings, agreements and declarations
- Peace of Paris (1783) in which Great Britain signed treaties with France, Spain and the Dutch Republic and the United States
- Treaty of Versailles (disambiguation), treaties signed at the Palace of Versailles, in Versailles, a suburb of Paris
- List of treaties, a list of all known agreements, pacts, peaces, and major contracts between states, armies, governments, and tribal groups.
