= List of Paris meetings, agreements and declarations =

Agreements and declarations resulting from meetings in Paris include:

== Listed by name ==
=== Paris Accords ===
may refer to:

- Paris Accords, the agreements reached at the end of the London and Paris Conferences in 1954 concerning the post-war status of Germany. [For parallel conferences for peace in Korea and in Indochina, see Berlin Conference (1954) and 1954 Geneva Conference]
- Paris Peace Accords, in 1973, ending United States involvement in the Vietnam War
- Paris Agreement, the 2015 agreement related to the United Nations Framework Convention on Climate Change, sometimes called the Paris Accords

=== Paris Agreement[s] ===
may refer to:

- Paris Agreements about the status of West Germany reached at the London and Paris Conferences in 1954. [For parallel conferences for peace in Korea and in Indochina, see Berlin Conference (1954) and 1954 Geneva Conference]
- 1991 Paris Peace Agreements, related to the Cambodian–Vietnamese War
- Paris Agreement, international treaty on climate change, adopted in 2015

=== Paris Charter ===
refers to the Charter of Paris for a New Europe (1990), which helped to found the Organization for Security and Co-operation in Europe (OSCE)

=== Paris Convention ===
may refer to:

- Paris Convention for the Protection of Industrial Property (1883)
- Paris Convention of 1919, regarding international aerial navigation
- Paris Convention on Third Party Liability in the Field of Nuclear Energy (1960)

=== Paris Conference ===
may refer to:

- The first three International monetary conferences:
  - Paris Monetary Conference (1867)
  - Paris Monetary Conference (1878)
  - Paris Monetary Conference (1881)
- Paris Conference on Passports & Customs Formalities and Through Tickets (1920)
- Paris Economic Conference (1916)
- Paris Peace Accords (1973)
- 2015 United Nations Climate Change Conference, held in Paris

=== Paris Peace Conference ===
may refer to:

- Congress of Paris (1856), negotiations ending the Crimean War
- Treaty of Paris (1898), an agreement that involved Spain ceding Puerto Rico, Guam, and the Philippines to the United States
- Paris Peace Conference (1919–1920), negotiations ending World War I
- Paris Peace Treaties, 1947, which ended World War II for most nations
- Paris Peace Accords, 1973 treaty ending American involvement in the Vietnam War
- The Paris Peace Conference on Cambodia (July 1989 - October 1991), which resolved Cambodia–China relations
- Paris Peace Forum, an event first held in 2018

=== Paris Principles ===
may refer to:

- Paris Principles (cataloging) (PP), international conference and resolution on bibliographical cataloging standard principles in 1961
- Paris Principles (human rights standards), international workshop on National Institutions for the Promotion and Protection of Human Rights in 1991
- "The Paris Principles: Principles and guidelines on children associated with armed forces or armed groups", see Free Children from War conference in 2007

=== Paris Protocol[s] ===
may refer to:

- Paris Protocols, agreement between Nazi Germany and Vichy France in 1941
- Paris Protocol (1952), status of NATO headquarters
- Protocol on Economic Relations, agreement between Israel and the Palestinian Authority in 1994

== Listed by date ==
- 1856 * Congress of Paris (1856), negotiations ending the Crimean War
- 1867 * Paris Monetary Conference (1867), first of a series of international monetary conferences
- 1878 * Paris Monetary Conference (1878)
- 1881 * Paris Monetary Conference (1881)
- 1883 * Paris Convention for the Protection of Industrial Property (1883)
- 1898 * Treaty of Paris (1898), an agreement that involved Spain ceding Puerto Rico, Guam, and the Philippines to the United States
- 1916 * Paris Economic Conference (1916)
- 1919 * Paris Convention of 1919, regarding international aerial navigation
- 1919–1920 * Paris Peace Conference (1919–1920), negotiations ending World War I
- 1920 * Paris Conference on Passports & Customs Formalities and Through Tickets (1920)
- 1941 * Paris Protocols, agreement between Nazi Germany and Vichy France in 1941
- 1947 * Paris Peace Treaties, 1947, which ended World War II for most nations
- 1952 * Paris Protocol (1952), status of NATO headquarters
- 1954 * Paris Accords, the agreements reached at the end of the London and Paris Conferences in 1954 concerning the post-war status of Germany
- 1960 * Paris Convention on Third Party Liability in the Field of Nuclear Energy (1960)
- 1961 * Paris Principles (cataloging) (PP), international conference and resolution on bibliographical cataloging standard principles in 1961
- 1973 * Paris Peace Accords, 1973 treaty ending United States involvement in the Vietnam War
- 1989–1991 * The Paris Peace Conference on Cambodia (July 1989 - October 1991), which resolved Cambodia–China relations
- 1990 * Paris Charter refers to the Charter of Paris for a New Europe (1990), which helped to found the Organization for Security and Co-operation in Europe (OSCE)
- 1991 * Paris Peace Agreements related to the war in Cambodia
- 1991 * Paris Principles (human rights standards), international workshop on National Institutions for the Promotion and Protection of Human Rights in 1991
- 1994 * Protocol on Economic Relations, agreement between Israel and the Palestinian Authority in 1994
- 2007 * "The Paris Principles: Principles and guidelines on children associated with armed forces or armed groups", see Free Children from War conference in 2007
- 2015 * Paris Agreement, the 2015 agreement related to the United Nations Framework Convention on Climate Change, sometimes called the Paris Accords
- 2018 * Paris Peace Forum, an event first held in 2018

== See also ==
- Treaty of Paris (disambiguation)
- Treaty of Versailles (disambiguation)
- Paris Commune of 1871
- Paris Commune (1789–1795)
