= Russo-Spanish War =

Part of the French Revolutionary Wars

The Russo-Spanish War was a conflict between the Russian Empire and Spain between 1799 and 1801, part of the wider French Revolutionary Wars. War was formally declared but – despite manoeuvring – no military action occurred.

== Russian-Spanish relations ==
By the early 1790s, Russian-Spanish relations had fully normalized following the end of the Nootka Crisis and after Spain's entry into the War of the First Coalition consultations began regarding the conclusion of a trade treaty and an agreement on the Russian-Spanish border in North America. This was hampered by Russia's rapprochement with Britain (concluded by a treaty on a mutual guarantee of possessions and military assistance on February 7 (18) 1795) and Spain concluding a separate peace with France (the second part of the Peace of Basel on 22 July).

Russia was extremely displeased with Spain's withdrawal from the coalition and the subsequent Second Treaty of San Ildefonso on 19 August 1796, which resulted in Spain joining France's war on Britain. The military action was extremely unsuccessful for Spain; a significant portion of its fleet was destroyed in the Battle of Cape St. Vincent and British ships blockaded Cádiz. Burdened by its dependence on the French, Manuel Godoy's government began exploring the possibility of a new rapprochement with Russia. Emperor Paul I proposed that the Spanish king denounce the alliance with France and declare his recognition of Louis XVIII as king, but Spain was unwilling to take such a radical step, as Russian chargé d'affaires Nikolai Byutsov reported to Chancellor Alexander Bezborodko on 19 October 1797. A disappointed Paul decided to postpone the planned dispatch of Baron Burckhard Alexius Constantin von Krüdener to Spain as ambassador.

== Malta Crisis ==
The spark for the war was the Maltese question. In 1797 the Sovereign Military Order of Malta sought and gained Russian protection and - after Malta surrendered to Napoleon Bonaparte's fleet on its way to Egypt - some of the Order's knights moved to Russia. Paul I was proclaimed Grand Master in October 1798 - and despite the fact that the election was contrary to the Order's statutes - the western powers needed to maintain their alliance with Russia and so recognised it, as did all the Order's priories except the Spanish ones.

The previous grand master Ferdinand von Hompesch zu Bolheim had been persuaded to surrender to Bonaparte by the Spanish representative in Malta, F Amat. This displeased Paul I but his position softened after the Madrid court disavowed Amat's actions and expressed its readiness to assist in returning the Order to Malta.

At the end of February 1799, Paul declared that:

although we do not harbor any hostile feelings towards Spain, seeing its enforced participation in the present war, we do not have any special relations with it and we postpone settling our position in this case in accordance with the future behaviour of the Madrid court.

Spain's course of action was determined when it learned of the terms of the Anglo-Russian-Neapolitan Convention of 29 November 1798 and the plans for an allied expedition to recapture the island and establish a Russian naval base there. Charles IV refused to recognize the new title of Russian Emperor and communicated that through his chargé d'affaires in Saint Petersburg Joaquín de Onis.

== Declaration of war ==
Paul took Spain's position as a personal insult and on 23 March 1799 recalled Byutsov. A few days later, without waiting for Madrid's response, he ordered Onis and the commercial vice-consul B. de Mendizabal to leave Russia.

On 15 (26) July a manifesto declaring war was published, which stated:

Having accepted the intention of our allies to eradicate the lawless rule existing in France, we rose up against it with all our might (...) Among the small number of European powers, outwardly loyal, but in truth fearing the consequences of the vengeance of this dying Bogomerian rule, Spain revealed more than others its fear and devotion to France (...) Now, having learned that our chargé d'affaires, adviser Byutsov (...) was forced to leave the possessions of the King of Spain, taking this as an insult to our majesty, we declare war on him, ordering that sequestration be imposed in all ports of our empire and all Spanish merchant ships located in them be confiscated, and that we send orders to all the commanders of our land and naval forces to act hostilely everywhere and towards all subjects of the King of Spain.

Having received the text of the manifesto, Charles IV issued a decree on 9 September declaring war on Russia, unable to resist a caustic characterization of the deplorable state of his opponent's mental faculties:

Among others, Russia particularly wishes to stand out. Its Emperor, dissatisfied with the title he had assumed and the lack of sympathy for his stated intentions at this time, issued a decree declaring war, the publication of which alone is sufficient to recognize the depth of its folly. (...)

I read this declaration without surprise, as the treatment of my chargé d'affaires and other, no less strange, actions of this sovereign had long indicated that this was to be expected. Therefore, in ordering the Russian chargé d'affaires, Councilor Byutsov, to leave my court and the state, I was guided far less by a sense of indignation than by the need to respect my person. Based on these principles, I cannot but respond to the attacks contained in the Russian decree. It is quite obvious that it contains threats against me and against all the monarchs of Europe. Since I am aware of the influence England currently exerts on the Tsar, seeking to humiliate me, I will respond to the aforementioned decree without intending to account for my political connections to anyone, except perhaps to the Almighty, with whose help I hope to repel any unjust aggression from those whose arrogance and deceitful actions are directed against me and my subjects, for whose protection and security I will employ the most effective methods. I proclaim a declaration of war against Russia and order an attack on her possessions and inhabitants.

D. A. Milyutin spoke of the expressions of the Spanish king as harsh and offensive to Russia, and Bennigsen (a German mercenary in Russian service), in a letter to B. B. Fock a few days after Paul's murder, writes with undisguised glee that "the king [of Spain], in his reply manifesto, rightly tried to show the tsar's ridiculous side, because the opponents could not have met either on land, or at sea".

== Course ==
According to Milyutin, "the rift between Spain and Russia, given the geographical position of both states, seemed insignificant", but the Spanish ambassador was subsequently expelled from Constantinople, as the Ottoman Empire had joined the coalition. British diplomacy had probably pushed the impulsive Emperor into war with Spain, but on 18 September it also enabled Russia and Portugal to conclude a defensive and offensive alliance against France and Spain. This required Russia to send 6,000 infantry and cavalry to Portugal and Portugal to send five ships of the line and a frigate to help Russia.

Another potential theatre of operations was the northwest coast of North America and so, in order to consolidate Russia's control of its Pacific possessions, it accelerated its somewhat-stalled process of merging commercial organizations. On 9 (20) July a decree by Paul I announced the creation of a single Russian-American Company, officially controlling all lands discovered by the Russians up to 55°20' north latitude, as well as any no-man's-land that could be developed south of this line.

Bennigsen's semi-anecdotal report relates that the eccentric emperor intended to make General J. A. Castro de la Cerda, a distant descendant of Alfonso X of Castile, King of Spain. It is unknown to what extent Bennigsen's words can be trusted, since he was a plotter of Paul's murder and so it was advantageous for him to present his victim in a ridiculous and inappropriate manner, but it is quite possible that Paul could have jokingly promised one of his generals the Spanish crown.

Neither Russia nor Spain had sufficient forces in the North Pacific for military action, but both sides seriously feared an enemy attack. According to Ekkehard Völkl and William Robertson, in December 1799 or January 1800 Madrid informed the Viceroy of New Spain that, according to a report from the ambassador in Vienna, the British ambassador in Vienna Lord Minto had proposed a plan to the Russians for a joint invasion of California. No trace of this plan survives in the archives and it is possible that this is an unfounded rumour, especially since such an informed contemporary as Francisco de Miranda, who maintained close contact with Pitt the Younger and Russia's ambassador to Britain Semyon Vorontsov, did not mention anything of the sort in his notes.

For his part, Viceroy Miguel José de Azanza, in a report dated 20 December 1799, proposed concentrating several warships in the port of Acapulco due to the small number of troops in the region. The following day, he warned the Governor of the Californias, Diego de Borica, of the potential threat posed by the Russo-Spanish War. On February 8, 1800, the governor notified the garrison commanders of a possible Russian attack.

Russia also took defensive measures. A regiment under the command of Colonel A. A. Somov was urgently transferred from Irkutsk to the coast of the Sea of Okhotsk, with the task of stationing military units in Kamchatka, the Gizhigin Fortress, Okhotsk, and the Uda Fortress. Captain I. Bukharin arrived at the port of Okhotsk from Saint Petersburg "to prepare transports." An order was given to "arm the corvette Slava Rossii, remaining from the Billings expedition, if it was still serviceable".

In spring 1800 the American ship Enterprise arrived in Kodiak harbor. Its captain, James Scott, informed the governor of Russian America, A. A. Baranov, that the Spanish were planning to send a warship to attack Russian settlements. This news turned out to be false, but it caused considerable concern. On 24 July (4 August), 1800, Baranov informed E. G. Larionov, the head of the Unalaska office of the Russian American Company, that he intended to await developments on Sitka and planned to hide the sea otter fur depots in the island's interior.

== Results ==
In 1800, convinced of the betrayal of his coalition allies, Paul expelled the Austrian and British ambassadors from Russia and began negotiations for an alliance with Bonaparte, which also led to an improvement in Russo-Spanish relations. The war, declared but never launched, was officially ended under Alexander I by the Treaty of Paris in October 1801.

Despite the peace, Charles IV refused to recognize the Tsar's claims as protector of the Order. Considering that the Order had become an appendage of a foreign power and was unable to fulfil its former service to Christendom, and in order to prevent its substantial revenues from leaving the country, the King of Spain proclaimed himself Grand Master of the Order in his domains on 17 April 1802. Although the Peace of Amiens stipulated that Britain return the Maltese archipelago to the Order, it did not comply. This sparked the War of the Third Coalition and it only gained full independence in 1964.

== Bibliography ==
- Милютин, Д. А. (1857). История войны 1799 года между Россией и Францией: в 3 томах. — 2-е изд (in Russian). Vol. III 111. Saint Petersburg: Императорской академии наук.
- Альперович, М. С. (1993). Россия и Новый Свет (последняя треть XVIII в.) (in Russian). Moscow: Наука. ISBN 5-02-008692-4.
- Беннигсен, Л. Л. (1917). Два письма // Исторический вестник (in Russian). Vol. 148. Saint Petersburg: А. С. Суворина. pp. 528–567.
- Robertson W. S. (1908). "Francisco de Miranda and the Revolutionizing of Spanish America". Annual Report of the American Historical Association for the year 1907. Vol. I. Washington: Government printing office.
- (in Spanish) Tratado de paz entre el rey nuestro señor y el emperador de las Rusias, concluido y firmado en París a 4 de octubre de 1801, con su traducción al castellano. Tratados, etc.Rusia,1801. Madrid: Imprenta Real. 1802.
