= Treaty of Paris (8 October 1801) =

1801 treaty between France and Russia

France and Russia signed a treaty of peace in Paris on 8 October 1801. The treaty formally ended Russo-French hostilities in the War of the Second Coalition. Two days later, on 10 October, they signed a secret convention of alliance. The signatories for both were Charles-Maurice de Talleyrand-Périgord for France and Count Arkady Morkov for Russia. Ratifications were exchanged on 11 October. The French law recognizing the treaty is dated 9 December 1801.

The public peace treaty contained declarations of perpetual peace and friendship. The secret convention contained the real bases for Franco-Russian relations going forward. It contained an agreement to work together to a satisfactory arrangement in the Holy Roman Empire, which at the time was in the process of putting into effect the terms of the Treaty of Lunéville of 9 February 1801 through the a Reichsdeputation. France and Russia declared it their intent to find a "just equilibrium between the Houses of Austria and Brandenburg", that is, between the Habsburgs and the Hohenzollern. Since the Tsar Alexander I was related to the rulers of Baden, Bavaria and Württemberg, First Consul Napoléon Bonaparte agreed to increase to their power to counterbalance the Habsburgs of Austria and Hohenzollerns of Prussia.

The Russo-French peace was part of a flurry of diplomatic activity winding down the War of the Second Coalition. Shortly before the peace with Russia, France signed a preliminary agreement with the United Kingdom in London on 1 October. This ultimately resulted in the Peace of Amiens. On 4 October, Morkov signed a peace treaty in Paris with Spain. Between the two Franco-Russian agreements, France signed a preliminary peace with the Ottoman Empire in Paris on 9 October. This was finalized in the Treaty of Paris of June 1802.

== Text ==
- Alexandre de Clercq, ed. (1880). "Traité de paix conclu à Paris le 8 octobre 1801 entre la France et la Russie". Recueil des traités de la France. Vol. I. A. Durand et Pedone-Lauriel. pp. 467–468.
- Alexandre de Clercq, ed. (1880). "Convention secrète conclue à Paris le 18 vendémiaire an X (10 octobre 1801) entre la République Française et la Russie". Recueil des traités de la France. Vol. I. A. Durand et Pedone-Lauriel. pp. 474–475.
- Michel Kerautret, ed. (2002). "Traité de paix de Paris avec la Russie (8 et 10 october 1801)". Les grands traités du Consulat (1799–1804): documents diplomatiques du Consulat et de l'Empire. Vol. 1. Nouveau Monde. pp. 212–218.

== Bibliography ==
- Mikaberidze, Alexander (2020). The Napoleonic Wars: A Global History. Oxford University Press.
- Morales Moya, Antonio (2003). 1802, España entre dos siglos: Monarquía, estado, nación. Sociedad Estatal de Conmemoraciones Culturales.
- Ramm, Agatha (1967). Germany, 1789–1919: A Political History. Methuen.
