= Arkady Morkov =

Russian politician (1747–1827)

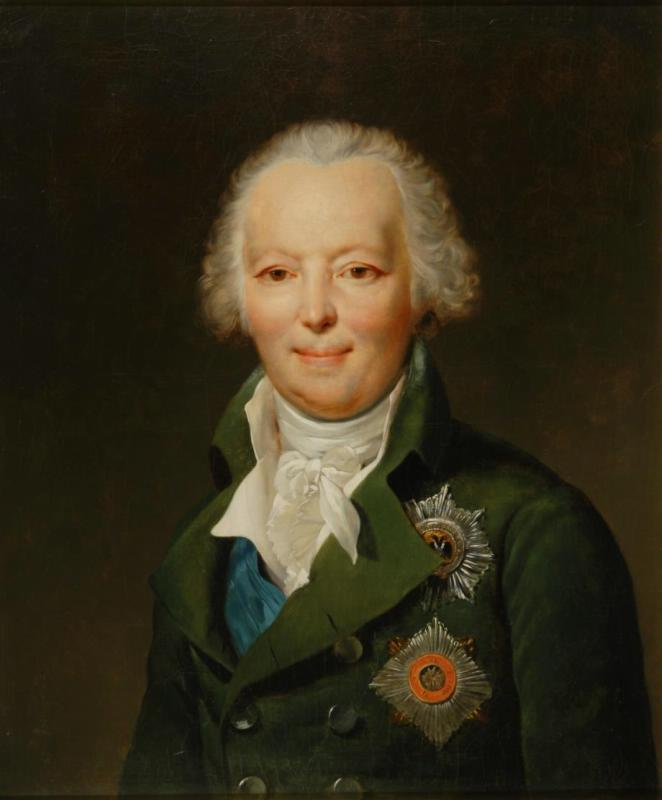
- Arkadiy Ivanovich Morkov
- Born: 17 January 1747
- Died: 10 February 1827 (aged 80)
- Resting place: Lazarevskoe Cemetery
- Education: Imperial Moscow University (1764)

Arkady Ivanovich Morkov (Russian: Аркадий Иванович Морков; 17 January [O.S. 6 January] 1747 – 10 February [O.S. 29 January] 1827) was a Russian Imperial diplomat, noble (count), and Active Privy Councillor of Russia.

Morkov was the member of the Russian Collegium for Foreign Affairs and Alexander Bezborodko aide. He later replaced Bezborodko. He served as the ambassador to the Netherlands (1781–83), to Sweden (1785–86) and to France (1801–03). In this last capacity, he signed the Treaty of Paris that formally ended Russian involvement in the War of the Second Coalition.
