= Mehmed Said Galip Pasha =

Grand Vizier of the Ottoman Empire from 1823 to 1824

Mehmed Said Galip Pasha (Modern Turkish: Mehmet Sait Galip Paşa; 1763/1764, Constantinople (Istanbul) – 1829, Balıkesir) was an Ottoman statesman. He was Grand Vizier of the Ottoman Empire from 13 December 1823 to 14 September 1824. He was a signatory of the Treaty of Paris (1802) with France, ending the French campaign in Egypt and Syria.
