= Vienna Convention on Civil Liability for Nuclear Damage =

1963 international treaty

- Signed: 21 May 1963
- Location: Vienna
- Effective: 12 November 1977
- Condition: 5 Ratifications
- Signatories: 13
- Parties: 40
- Depositary: Director General of the International Atomic Energy Agency
- Languages: English, French, Russian and Spanish

The Vienna Convention on Civil Liability for Nuclear Damage is a 1963 treaty that governs issues of liability in cases of nuclear accident. It was concluded at Vienna on 21 May 1963 and entered into force on 12 November 1977. The convention has been amended by a 1997 protocol, in force since 4 October 2003. The depository is the International Atomic Energy Agency.

As of February 2014, the convention has been ratified by 40 states. Colombia, Israel, Morocco, Spain, and the United Kingdom have signed the convention but have not ratified it. Slovenia has denounced the treaty and withdrawn from it to become party to the Paris Convention.

== See also ==
- Nuclear energy policy
- Nuclear power
- Nuclear power debate
- Paris Convention on Third Party Liability in the Field of Nuclear Energy
- Price-Anderson Nuclear Industries Indemnity Act
