= Paris Economy Pact =

1916 international economic agreement

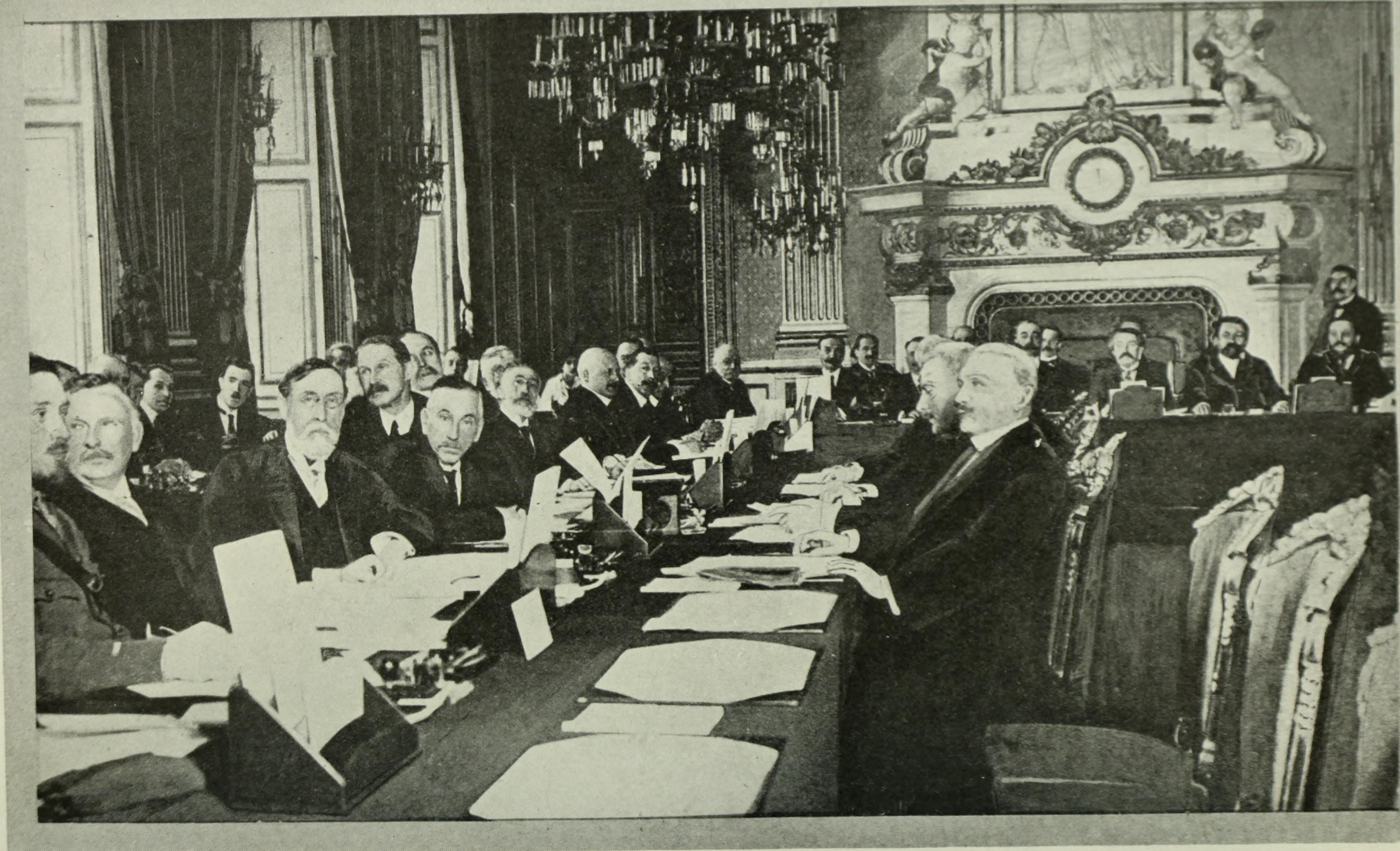

The Paris Economy Pact was an international economic agreement reached at the Paris Economic Conference, held from 14 June 1916 in Paris. The meeting, held at the height of World War I, included representatives of the Allied Powers: United Kingdom, France, Italy, Japan and Russia.

The pact was intended to isolate the Central Powers: the German Empire, the Austrian-Hungarian Empire, the Ottoman Empire and the Kingdom of Bulgaria. The Allied Powers envisioned isolating them through trade sanctions after the war. A standing body, the Comité permanent international d'action économique, based in Paris, was established to monitor the implementation of the pact.

The pact was of great concern to the American government, led by President Woodrow Wilson, which saw the continued fragmentation of Europe to be a risk for continued conflict. US Secretary of State Robert Lansing asked the staff of the US embassy in Paris to monitor the proceedings (the United States had not yet entered the war and was not one of the Allies). The issue of central concern to the United States was that the pact included schemes for the subsidization and the government ownership of manufacturing enterprises and the division of European markets for the pact participants.

The outcome of the Economic Conference foreshadowed the conflict between the United States and the Allies during the 1919 Paris Peace Conference.

The past concern of the US government with the pact remains fossilized in the US Code, in Title 19, Section 1332(c), which gives the United States International Trade Commission the "power to investigate the Paris Economy Pact and similar organizations and arrangements in Europe."

== See also ==
- World War I reparations
