= Treaty of Paris (August 1801) =

A Treaty of Paris was signed on 24 August 1801 between Napoleonic France and Elector Maximilian IV Joseph of Bavaria, during the War of the Second Coalition.

France obtained the Palatinate territories, at time a Bavarian dependency, on the Left Bank of the Rhine, notably the Duchy of Jülich and the County Palatine of Zweibrücken. However, Napoleon was not interested in humiliating the Wittelsbachs, a secondary opponent that could become a possible ally against the main enemy Austria. More, since the beginning of his reign the Bavarian elector had searched favorable exchanges for his divided hereditary domains, so Napoleon offered an indemnity in Germany to Bavaria in event of a French friendliness, and so it happened.
