= Treaty of Paris (1320) =

1320 treaty between France and Flanders

The Treaty of Paris concluded the Franco-Flemish War. It was signed on May 5, 1320, by Philippe V of France and Robert III of Flanders. The original is preserved at the Departmental archives of Nord.

== Sources ==
- DehaisneThe Treaty of Paris of 5 May 1320 was intended to reconcile Robert III, Count of Flanders, with the French King Philip V. The signing was preceded by years of discontent on the Flemish side. The resentment stretched back at least as far as the Franco-Flemish War of 1300. Here the troops of the French King Philip IV succeeded in capturing Guido I of Dampierre, the then Count of Flanders, his son Robert and several noblemen. They were not released until 1305. The father had died during his imprisonment and his son Robert, Count of Nevers and also called Robert of Béthune, had become the new Count of Flanders. The condition for the release and return of the County of Flanders was the acceptance of the Treaty of Athis-sur-Orge dictated by France in 1305. The oppressive burdens imposed led to renewed opposition in Flanders . Even a peace sworn by Count Robert III in Pontoise on 11 July 1312, with the towns of Lille, Douai and Béthune being pledged to the French crown, was short-lived, for from 1314 to 1316 the Flemish again went to war against France, which the kingdom won. New burdens were placed on the county. The latent warlike tendencies of the Flemish and their count affected the business of the cities in Flanders, which made good money from the cloth trade. Their insistence on peace paved the way for the Treaty of Paris. France's ruler, in turn, was interested in keeping the county in his sphere of influence, especially since the cities there would have liked to see their ruling house enter into a liaison with England. The treaty stipulated that Louis II of Nevers (he was the grandson of Robert III, whose son was Louis I of Nevers ) would marry Margaret of France, a daughter of the French King Philip V. The couple married on 21 July 1320. The towns of Lille, Douai and Orchies were definitively given to France in this treaty. Count Robert III of Flanders was excluded from the line of succession. The Flemish were to raise 30,000 livres for the king and not to support their count in the event of any breach of contract. Despite the forced fealty to the French king, Robert III did not become a loyal crown vassal. He boycotted financial obligations and strove for less French dependence for Flanders until his death in 1322.s, Chrétien (1899). Archives Départementales du Nord: inventaire sommaire des Archives Départementales Antérieures à 1790 (in French). Nord: Danel. p. 200.
- Pirenne, Henri (4 October 2010). A History of Europe (Routledge Revivals): From the Invasions to the XVI Century. Routledge. p. 397. ISBN 9781136879340.
