= Treaty of Paris (1718) =

The Treaty of Paris was a treaty signed in Paris on January 21, 1718, between the Regent of the Kingdom of France, Philip of Orléans, and his brother-in-law, the Duke of Lorraine and Bar, Leopold I. The treaty transferred ownership of lands and municipalities in Grand Est and Saarland.

Under Article 2, Leopold ceded the five villages Ensdorf, Beaumarais, Fraulautern, Lisdorf, and Roden and the city of Wallerfangen in the district of Saarland to France.

Under Article 3, Philip of Orléans appointed Leopold as the Prévôt of Longwy while affirming control of the town of Longwy.

Under Article 10, five previously undivided Grand Est villages were divided between the signatories. Hagéville, Jonville, and Vilcey went to France while Arnaville and Olley went to Léopold.

Under Article 11, Leopold sold Knutange for the castle of Bauzemont.

Under Article 13, France gave Leopold the castle of Rambervillers.
