= Paris Protocol (1952) =

1952 treaty of NATO states

On 28 August 1952 the then NATO member states signed the Paris Protocol in Paris.

Its official title is "On the Status of International Military Headquarters Set up Pursuant to the North Atlantic Treaty" and it establishes the status of allied and national headquarters and respective procedures. The Protocol is part of the so-called NATO legal acquis.

All NATO member states have ratified the protocol, except Finland and Sweden. France ratified the protocol in 1955 but denounced its ratification in 1966, then ratified the protocol again in 2016.
