= Luigi Toro =

Italian painter (1835–1900)

Luigi Toro (3 January 1835, in Sessa Aurunca – 13 April 1900) was an Italian painter and patriot. He painted historical canvases in a Romantic style.

== Biography ==
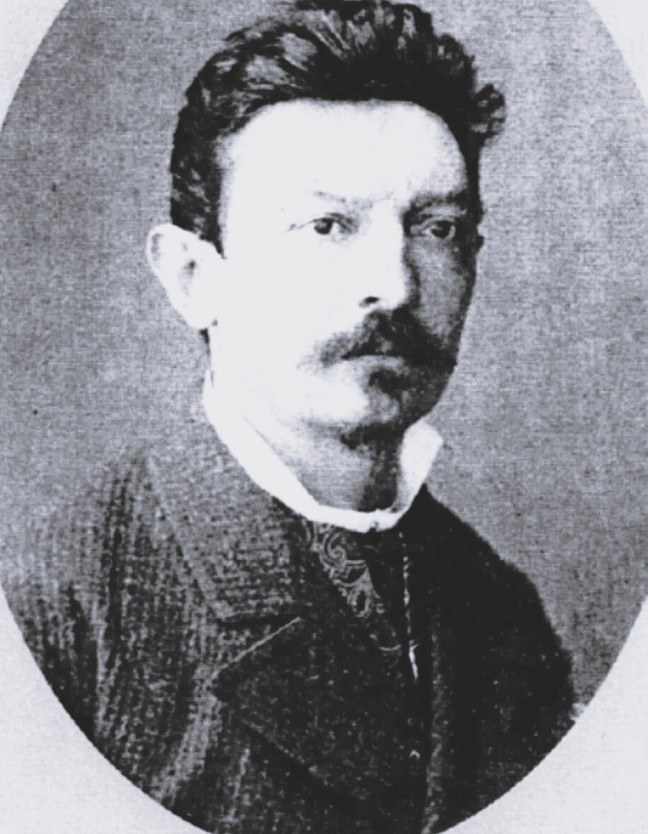
Luigi Toro.

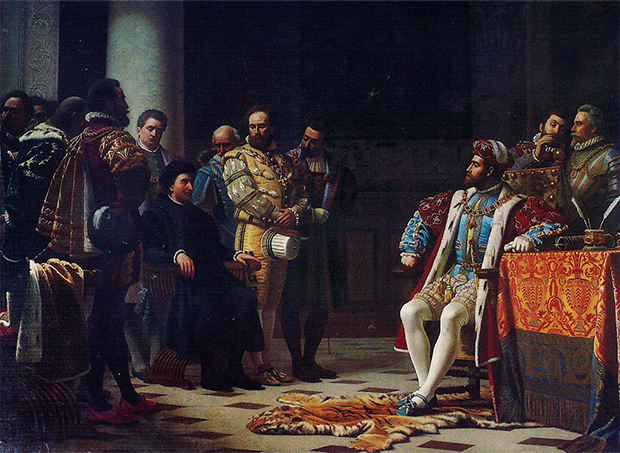
Agostino Nifo at the Court of Charles V (oil 285x396 cm)

Born to a family of little means, Luigi was orphan of father by a young age. In 1853, he attended the Royal Institute of Fine Arts of Naples, and there studied under Giuseppe Mancinelli, Domenico Morelli, and Bernardo Celentano. From 1856 to 1859, he lived in Florence, where he frequented the Caffè Michelangiolo and met painters of the Macchiaioli movement. In 1857, he moved to Rome to work under Francesco Coghetti.

He had moved to Paris for a spell, when in 1859, he moved back to Italy to join the Cacciatori delle Alpi in the battles against the Austrians. In 1860, he joined the expedition of General Enrico Cosenz to join the forces of Garibaldi in Palermo. He joined the Garibaldini in the landings in Calabria, which later he memorialized in the paintings depicting Avamposti de' primi 200 garibaldini sbarcati in Calabria and Garibaldini explorers in Calabria.

After the Battle of the Volturnus on 1 October 1860, he was promoted to be an officer of Nino Bixio. With the Italian unification, he was made a major in the National Guard, and contributed to the efforts to repress brigandage in the South.

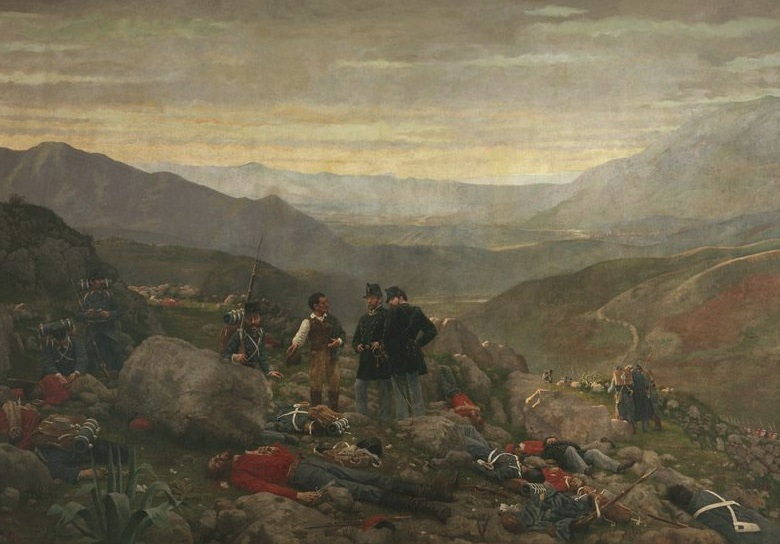
Death of Pilade Bronzetti at Castel Morrone, 1885 (oil on canvas 400x 610 cm)

By 1870, he moved to Rome, where he opened a studio on Via Margutta #33. In 1873 at the Esposizione Internazionale of Vienna, he exhibited a Riposo di cacciatori (Hunters at Rest). In 1877 at the National Exposition of Naples, he exhibited: Agostino Nifo at the Court of Charles V. He also painted The Death of Pilade Bronzetti at Castel Morrone, in memory of an officer who died fighting at the Battle of Volturno; and Taddeo da Sessa at the Council of Lyon defends the Emperor Frederick II.

== Bibliography ==
- Giuseppe Stopiti, ed. (1885). "Toro, cavalieri Luigi". Galleria Biografica d'Italia. Rome.
- Angelo De Gubernatis; Ugo Martini (1889). "Toro (Luigi)". Dizionario degli artisti italiani viventi. Pittori, scultori e architetti. Florence. p. 524.
- Nicola Borelli (1921). "Un artista e un patriota dimenticato. Luigi Toro". Rivista Campana, periodico trimestrale di storia, etnografia, lettere ed arte. 1 (4). Maddaloni. republished in "Un artista e un patriota dimenticato. Luigi Toro". Il Mensile Suessano. Vol. XI, no. 112. 1993. pp. 1539–1545.
- Agostino Mario Comanducci (1945). "Luigi Toro". In Grafitalia (ed.). Dizionario illustrato dei pittori e incisori italiani moderni, 1800-1900. Milan.
- Mastrostefano, Gaetano; Maffei, Maria Elena; Puccio, Gianluca (2012). Caramanica Editore (ed.). Luigi Toro, pittore e patriota dell'800. Marina di Minturno.
