= Treaty of Versailles (disambiguation) =

The Treaty of Versailles is the 1919 peace treaty that followed the Paris Peace Conference and officially ended World War I.

The Treaty of Versailles may also refer to:

- Treaty of Versailles (1756), a defence alliance between France and Austria
- Treaty of Versailles (1757), an expansion of the 1756 Versailles treaty to Saxony, Sweden, and Russia
- Treaty of Versailles (1758), a confirmation of the 1756 and the 1757 Versailles treaties
- Treaty of Versailles (1768), a treaty in which the Republic of Genoa ceded Corsica to France
- Treaties of Versailles (1783), a treaty that ended French and Spanish hostilities against Great Britain in the American Revolutionary War
- Treaty of Versailles (1787), a treaty between France and the Vietnamese lord Nguyễn Ánh
- Treaty of Versailles (1871), a treaty that ended the Franco–Prussian War

== See also ==
- Little Treaty of Versailles, an additional treaty signed on the same date as the 1919 Treaty of Versailles between some of the newly established nations and the League of Nations
- Treaty of Paris (disambiguation)
