= War of the Second Coalition =

Second war on revolutionary France by European monarchies

- Part of the French Revolutionary Wars and the Coalition Wars
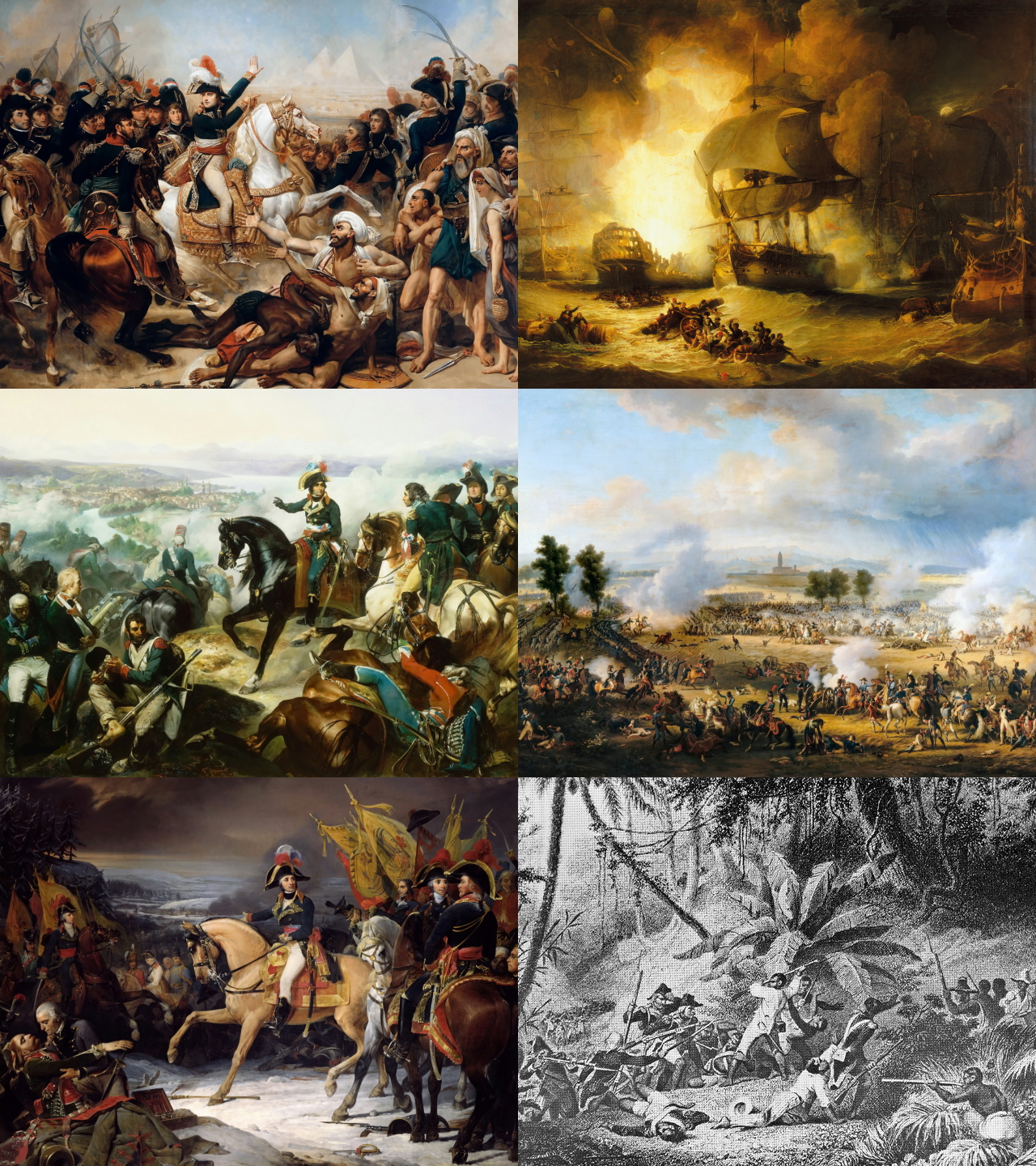
- War of the second coalition Click an image to load the appropriate article. Left to right, top to bottom: Battles of the Pyramids, the Nile, Zurich, Marengo, Hohenlinden, the Haitian Revolution
Date	28 June 1798 – 25 March 1802 (3 years, 8 months, 3 weeks and 4 days)
Location	Europe, West Asia, Mediterranean Sea, Caribbean Sea, Indian subcontinent
Result	French victory
Territorial changes	Trinidad, Ceylon and Malta to Britain; Parma and Louisiana to France; Tuscany to the House of Bourbon; Foundation of the Septinsular Republic; Portuguese Olivença to Spain and renamed Olivenza (Treaty of Badajoz); Reichsdeputationshauptschluss

Belligerents
Second Coalition: Holy Roman Empire (until 1801) (Note: Nominally the Holy Roman Empire, under Austrian Habsburg rule, also encompassed some other Italian states abolished in 1797, as well as other Habsburg states such as the Grand Duchy of Tuscany.): (Habsburg monarchy) Austria; Tuscany; Bavaria (Note: Left the war signing the treaty of Paris (August 1801).); United Kingdom (Note: Great Britain until 1801. Left the war signing the treaty of Amiens.); Russia (until 1801) (Note: Left the war signing the Treaty of Paris (8 October 1801).); Ottoman Empire (Note: Including the Mamluks and the Barbary Coast. Left the war signing the Treaty of Paris (1802) with France.); Naples (until 1801) (Note: Left the war signing the Treaty of Florence with France.); Portugal (until 1801) (Note: Left the war signing the Treaty of Badajoz (1801) with Spain and the Treaty of Madrid (1801) with France.); Sardinia (Note: Following the refusal to enter in alliance against the Two Sicilies, France declared war on both Naples and Piedmont-Sardinia the same day, 6 December. The Piedmontese Republic was proclaimed on 10 December 1798. The Sardinian king Charles Emmanuel IV fled to Cagliari.) Co-belligerent: United States (Quasi-War until 1800) (Note: An undeclared naval war between the United States and the French First Republic after Congress authorised a trade deal with Great Britain and suspended repaying French loans. Hostilities began in June 1798 and concluded in September 1800. The U.S. was never an official member of the Second Coalition.); Maratha Empire (Note: The Marathas supported the British against the Kingdom of Mysore in the Anglo-Mysore Wars)	French Republic (Spain) Spain; French client republics: (Note: And other supporting soldiers as the Polish Legions and some Mamluks in captivity.): Batavian Republic; (Italy) Cisalpine Republic; Helvetic Republic; (Genoa) Ligurian Republic; Co-belligerent: Mysore (Fourth Anglo-Mysore War until 1799) (Note: Napoleon Bonaparte, who wished to establish a French presence in the Middle East, planned to ally France with Mysore and even planned to defeat the British together but with Napoleon and Tipu's respective defeats, this plan was no longer possible.)

Commanders and leaders
(Habsburg monarchy) Francis II; (Kingdom of Naples) Ferdinand IV; (Kingdom of Naples) Maria Carolina; (Ottoman Empire) Selim III; (Kingdom of Portugal) Maria I; (Kingdom of Portugal) John; (Russian Empire) Paul I (until 1799); (Tuscany) Ferdinand III; Charles Emmanuel IV; (United Kingdom of Great Britain and Ireland) George III; (United Kingdom of Great Britain and Ireland) William Pitt (until 1801); (United Kingdom of Great Britain and Ireland) Henry Addington (from 1801); (Sovereign Military Order of Malta) Ferdinand von Hompesch zu Bolheim (surrendered); (Duchy of Lucca) Gonfalonier of Lucca; (United States) John Adams; Shahu II	(French First Republic) Paul Barras (until 1799); (French First Republic) Napoleon Bonaparte (from 1799); (Spain) Charles IV; Tipu Sultan †

Strength
(Russian Empire) 110,000 (total) (Ottoman Empire) 220,000 (total)	Unknown

Casualties and losses
(Habsburg monarchy) 200,000 killed and wounded 140,000 captured: 79,000 killed in combat; c. 147,000 died of disease; (Ottoman Empire) 65,000 killed, wounded, or captured (not counting disease)	(French First Republic) 75,000 killed in combat; c. 139,000 died of disease; 140,000 captured

Coalition Wars
List of numbered map items:
1 First Coalition: France 1792:...Toulon...
2 Second Coalition: Egypt 1798:...Pyramids...
3 Second Coalition: Italy 1799:...Marengo...
4 Third Coalition: Germany 1805:...Austerlitz...
5 Fourth Coalition: Prussia 1806:...Jena...
6 Fifth Coalition: Austria 1809:...Wagram...
7 Sixth Coalition: Germany 1813:...Leipzig...
8 Sixth Coalition: France 1814:...Paris...
9 Seventh Coalition: Belgium 1815:...Waterloo...

The War of the Second Coalition (French: Guerre de la Deuxième Coalition) (1798–1802) was the second war between revolutionary France and a coalition of European monarchies, led by Britain, Austria and Russia, and including the Ottoman Empire, Portugal, Naples and various German monarchies. Prussia did not join the coalition, while Spain supported France.

The overall goal of Britain and Russia was to stop the expansion of the French Republic and to restore the monarchy in France, while Austria – weakened and in deep financial debt from the War of the First Coalition – sought primarily to recover and strengthen its position. The first half of the war saw the Coalition drive the French back into Italy, Germany, and Holland, but they were not able to threaten an invasion of France, nor defeat the French decisively in battle. The second half of the war saw Napoleon and Moreau inflict major defeats, defeating most of the Coalition, which resulted in the status quo from the previous war being upheld.

Largely due to the differences in strategy among the three major allied powers, the Second Coalition failed to overthrow the revolutionary government, and French territorial gains since 1793 were confirmed. In the Franco-Austrian Treaty of Lunéville in February 1801, France held all of its previous gains and obtained new lands in Tuscany, in Italy. Austria was granted Venetia and the former Venetian Dalmatia. Most other allies also signed separate peace treaties with the French Republic in 1801. Britain and France signed the Treaty of Amiens in March 1802, followed by the Ottomans in June 1802, which brought an interval of peace in Europe that lasted several months until Britain declared war on France in May 1803, initiating the Napoleonic Wars.

== Background ==
On 20 April 1792, the French Legislative Assembly declared war on Austria. In the War of the First Coalition (1792–97), France fought against most of the states with which it shared a border, as well as Great Britain, Portugal and Prussia. The Coalition forces achieved several victories at the outset of the war, but were ultimately repulsed from French territory and then lost significant territories to the French, who began to set up client republics in their occupied territories. Napoleon Bonaparte's efforts in the northern Italian campaigns of the French Revolutionary Wars pushed Austrian forces back and resulted in the negotiation of the Treaty of Leoben (18 April 1797) and the Treaty of Campo Formio (October 1797), leaving Britain to fight on alone against France, Spain and the Netherlands.

== Peace interrupted ==
From October 1797 until March 1799, France and Austria, the signatories of the Treaty of Campo Formio, avoided armed conflict but remained skeptical of each other, and several diplomatic incidents undermined the agreement. The French demanded additional territory not mentioned in the Treaty. The Habsburgs were reluctant to hand over designated territories, much less additional ones. The Congress at Rastatt proved inept at orchestrating the transfer of territories to compensate the German princes for their losses. Republicans in the Swiss Cantons, supported by the French Revolutionary Army, abolished the old confederal order and established the centralized Helvetic Republic modeled on France.

Other factors contributed to the rising tensions. In the summer of 1798, Napoleon led an expedition to Egypt and Syria. On his way to Egypt, he had stopped at the heavily fortified port city of Valletta, the capital city of Hospitaller Malta. Grand Master Ferdinand von Hompesch zu Bolheim, who ruled the island, allowed only two ships at a time in the harbour, in accordance with the island's neutrality. Napoleon immediately ordered the bombardment of Valletta, and on 11 June 1798, General Louis Baraguey d'Hilliers directed a landing of several thousand French troops at strategic locations around the island. The French Knights of the order deserted, and the remaining Knights failed to mount a successful resistance. Napoleon forcibly removed the other Knights from their possessions, angering Emperor Paul I of Russia, who was the honorary head of the Order. Moreover, the French Directory was convinced that the Austrians were conniving to start another war. Indeed, the weaker the French Republic seemed, the more seriously the Austrians, Neapolitans, Russians and British actually discussed this possibility. Napoleon's army got trapped in Egypt, and after he returned to France (October 1799), it eventually surrendered (September 1801).

== Preliminaries to war ==
Military strategists in Paris recognized the strategic significance of the Upper Rhine Valley, the southwestern German regions, and Switzerland for the defense of the Republic. The control of the Swiss passes was crucial as they provided a key route to northern Italy. Therefore, the army that maintained control over these passes could swiftly deploy troops between the northern and southern theaters of operations.

Toward this end, in early November 1798, Marshal Jean-Baptiste Jourdan arrived in Hüningen to take command of the French forces there, called the Army of Observation because its function was to observe the security of the French border on the Rhine. Once there, he assessed the forces' quality and disposition and identified needed supplies and manpower. He found the army woefully inadequate for its assignment. The Army of the Danube and its two flanking armies, the Army of Helvetia and the Army of Mayence, or Mainz, were equally short of manpower, supplies, ammunition, and training; most resources were already directed to the Army in Northern Italy, the Army of Britain, and the Egyptian expedition. Jourdan assiduously documented these shortages, pointing out in lengthy correspondence to the Directory the consequences of an undermanned and undersupplied army; his petitions seemed to have little effect on the Directory, which sent neither significant additional manpower nor supplies.

Jourdan's orders were to take the army into Germany and secure strategic positions, particularly on the southwest roads through Stockach and Schaffhausen, at the westernmost border of Lake Constance. Similarly, as commander of the Army of Helvetia (Switzerland), André Masséna would acquire strategic positions in Switzerland, in particular the St. Gotthard Pass, the passes above Feldkirch, particularly Maienfeld (St. Luciensteig), and hold the central plateau in and around Zurich and Winterthur. These positions would prevent the Allies of the Second Coalition from moving troops back and forth between the northern Italian and German theatres, but would allow French access to these strategic passes. Ultimately, this positioning would allow the French to control all western roads leading to and from Vienna. Finally, the army of Mayence would sweep through the north, blocking further access to and from Vienna from any of the northern Provinces, or from Britain.

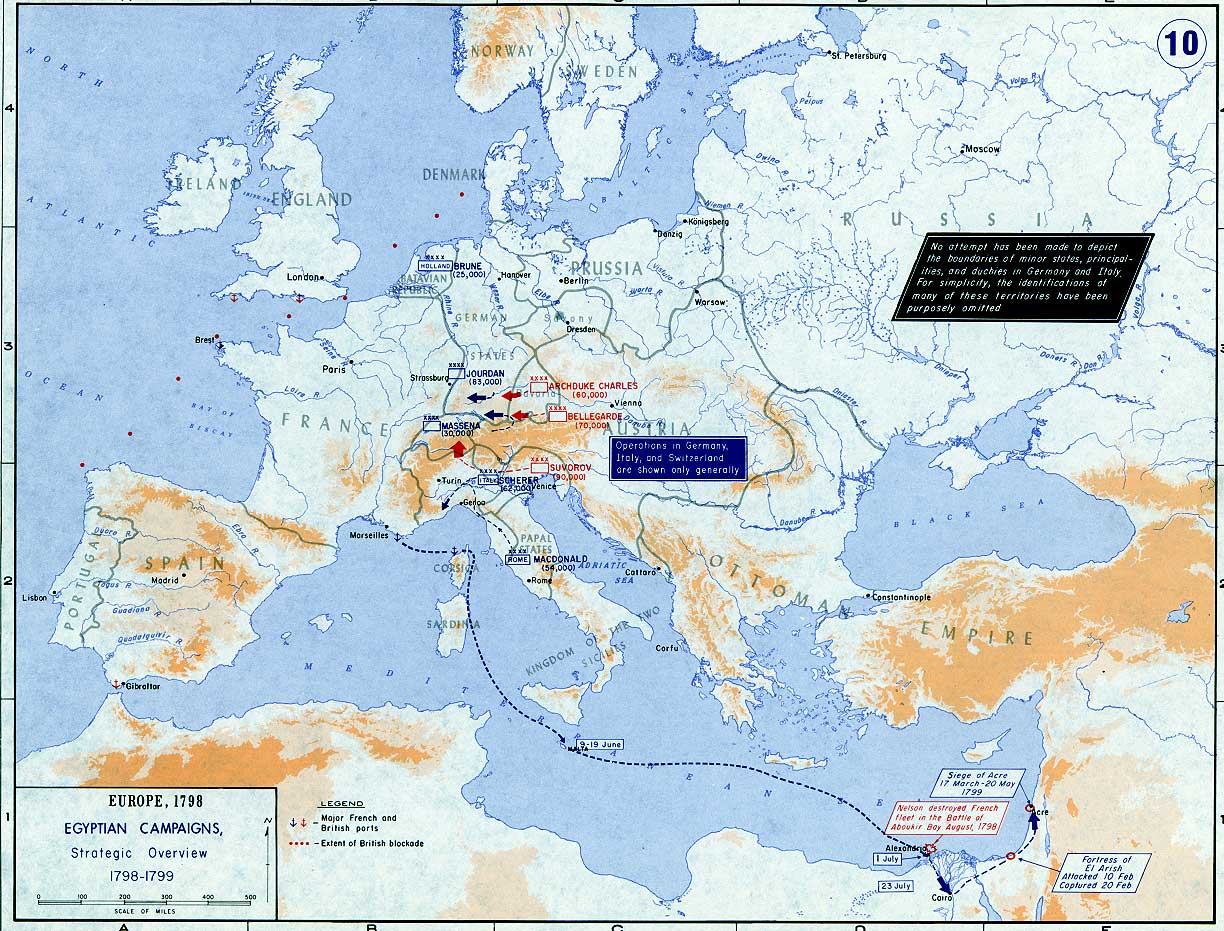
Strategic overview of operations in Europe and the Mediterranean in 1798–1799

== Formation of the Second Coalition ==
The Second Coalition took several months to form, starting with Naples allying itself with Austria (19 May 1798) and Russia (29 November), after which British Prime Minister Pitt and Austrian State Chancellor Thugut (the latter only on the condition that Russia also joined the coalition) failed to persuade Prussia (which had left the First Coalition as early as April 1795) to join in. Neither were Britain and Austria able to formalise an alliance, due to lack of an agreement on the loan convention that would cover Austria's outstanding debt to Britain from the previous war, let alone British subsidy to Austria for the upcoming war; they resorted to ad hoc cooperation without formal agreement. Next, Russia allied itself with the Ottoman Empire (23 December) and Great Britain (26 December) while attacking the French Ionian Islands. By 1 December, the Kingdom of Naples had signed alliances with both Russia and Great Britain.

The preliminary military action under the alliance occurred on 29 November when General Karl Mack, an Austrian serving Naples, occupied Rome, wishing to restore Papal authority with the Neapolitan army. King Ferdinand was pushed by his angry Austrian wife Queen Maria Carolina, Marie Antoinette's sister, and by Horatio Nelson through his secret lover, the British Ambassador's wife Emma, Lady Hamilton. All these companions became reckless gamblers when the poorly equipped and led Neapolitan army was not only soon defeated outside Rome and pushed back, but Naples itself was occupied by France on 23 January 1799. The king, the British officials and the women had only the time to escape to Sicily.

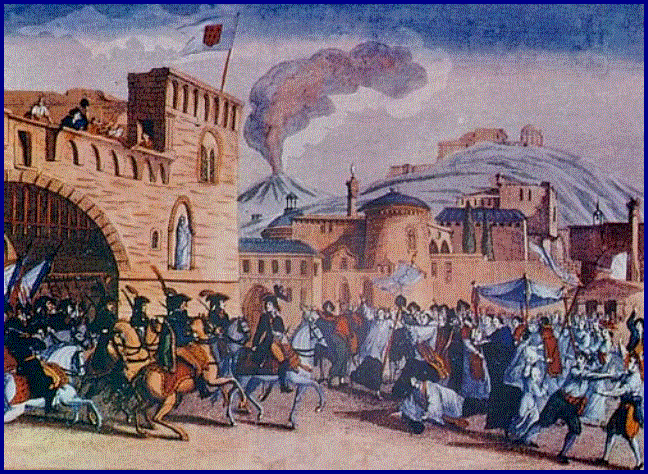
The French Army entering in Naples

== War ==
1799 campaigns

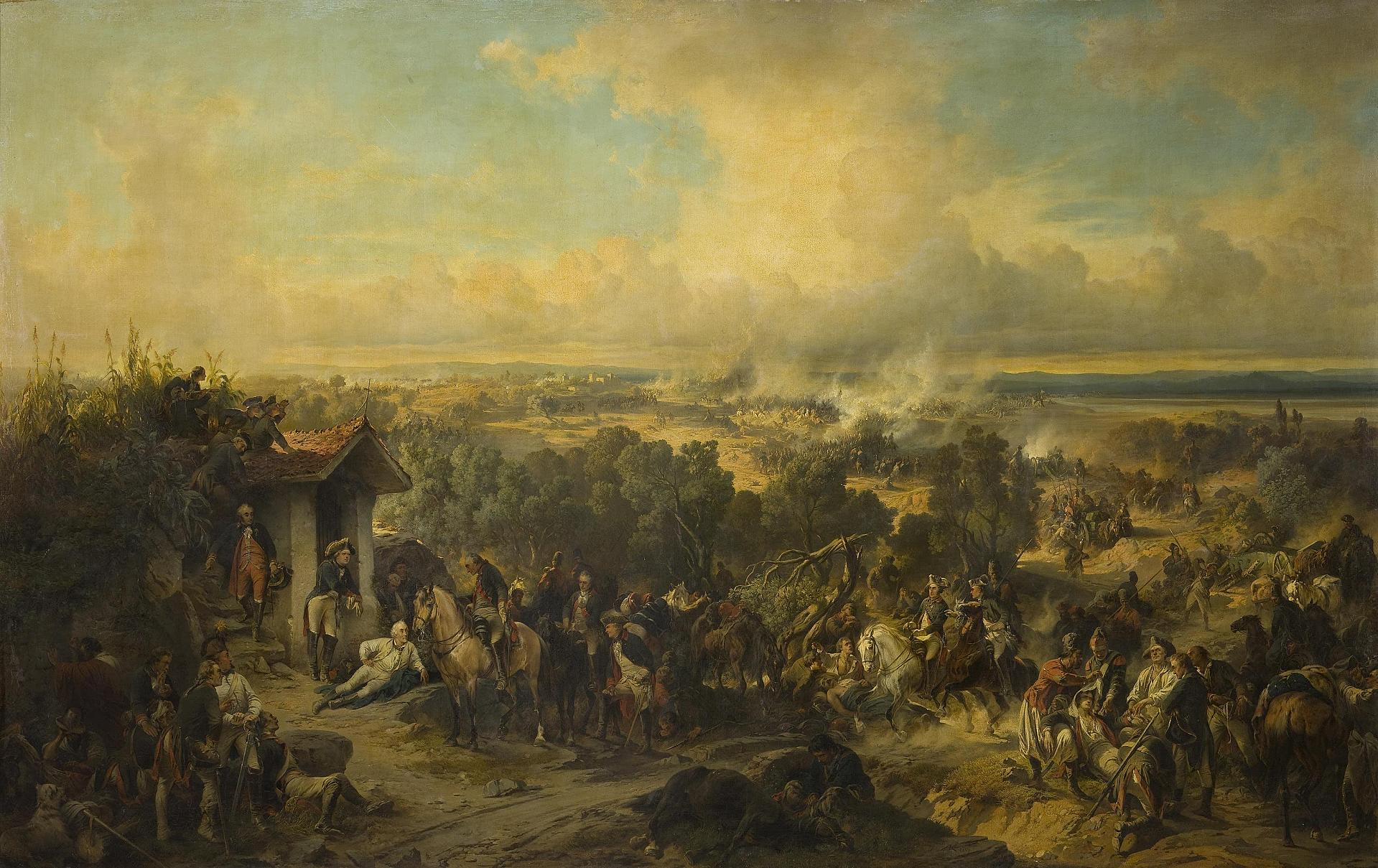
Field Marshal Alexander Suvorov at the Battle of the Trebbia
(Battle of the Trebbia on 8 June 1799 by Alexander von Kotzebue, 1857)

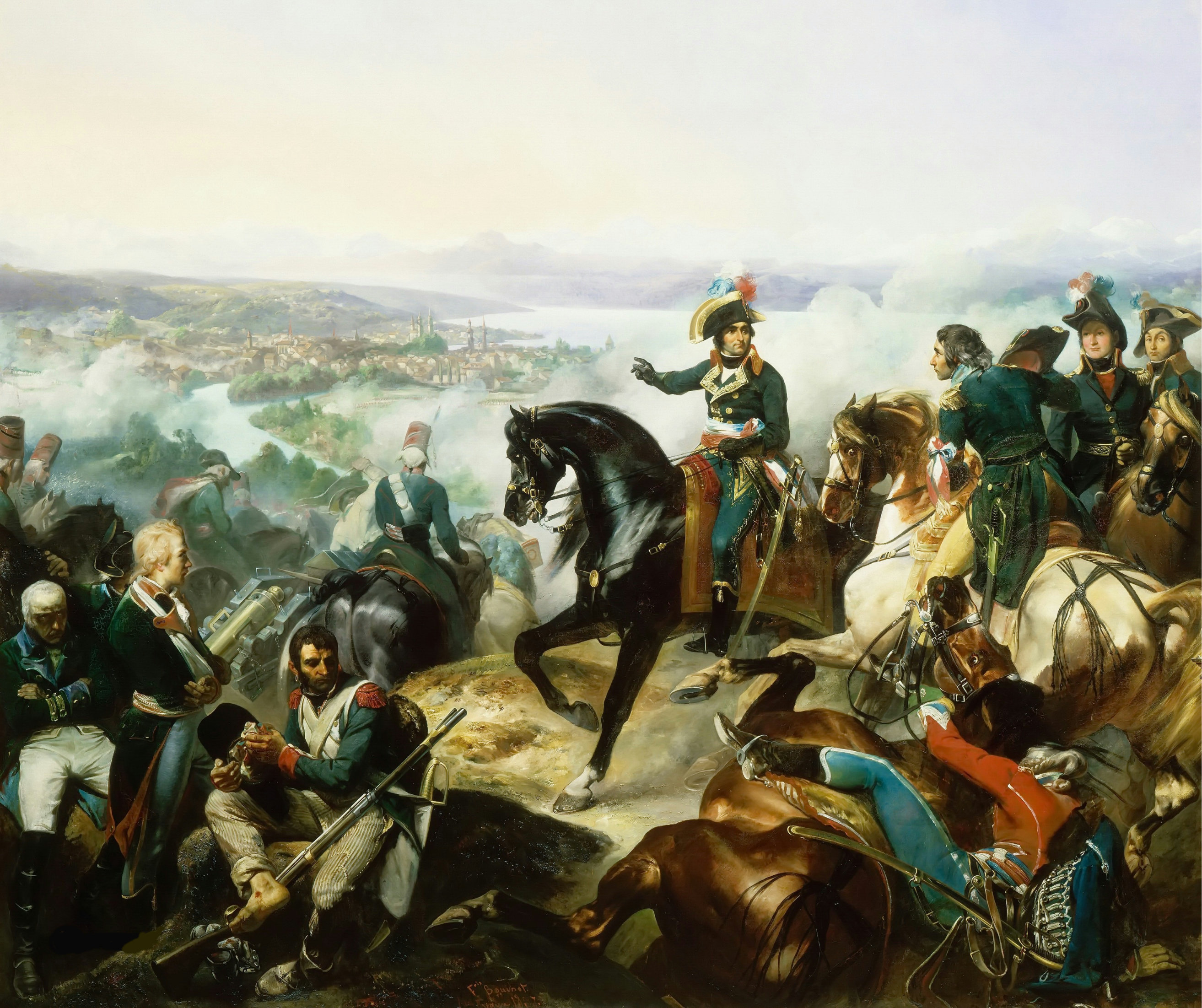
General André Masséna at the Second Battle of Zurich
(The Battle of Zurich, 25th September 1799 by François Bouchot, 1835)

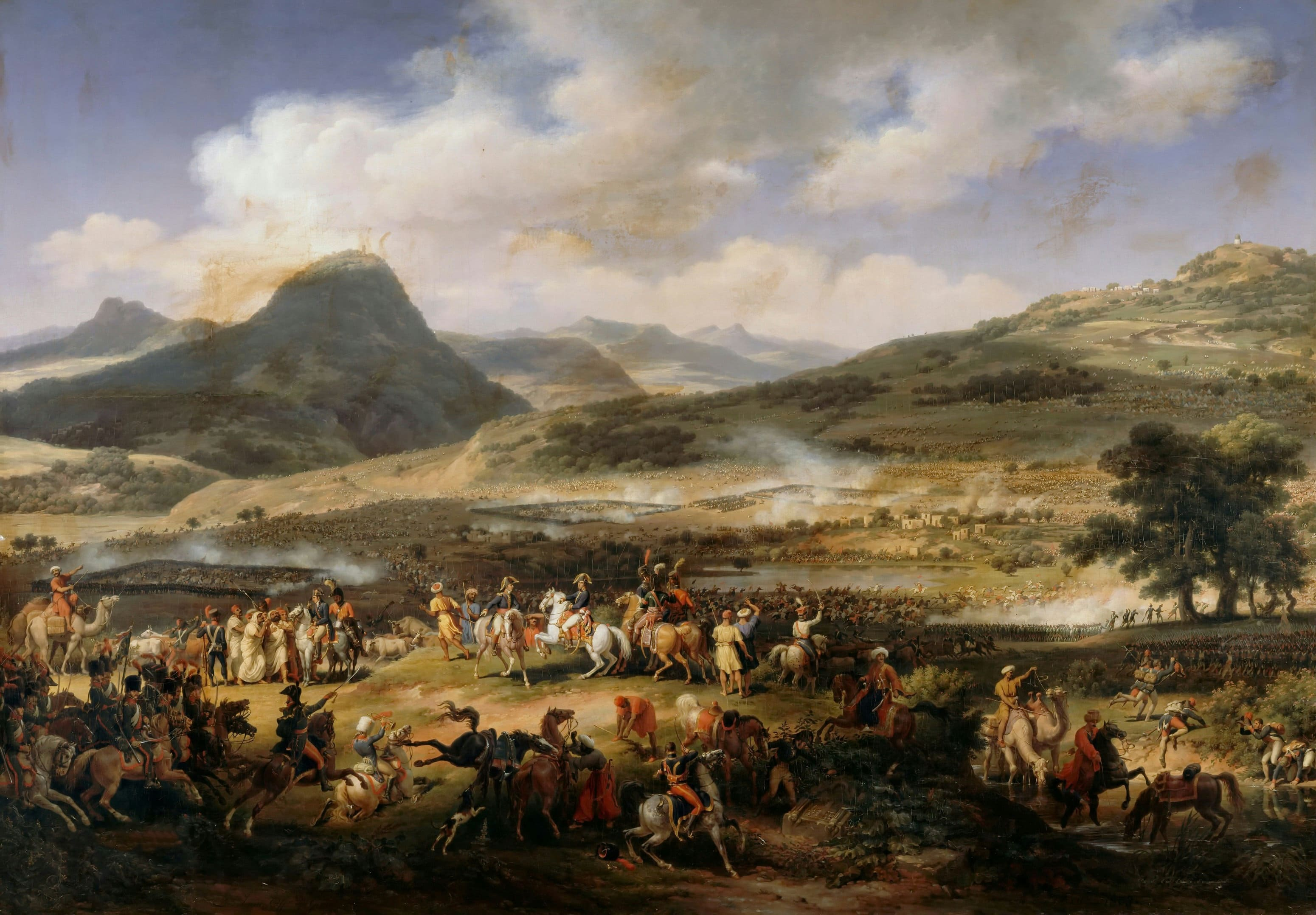
General Napoleon Bonaparte at the Battle of Mount Tabor
(The Battle of Mount Tabor by Louis-François Lejeune, 1804)

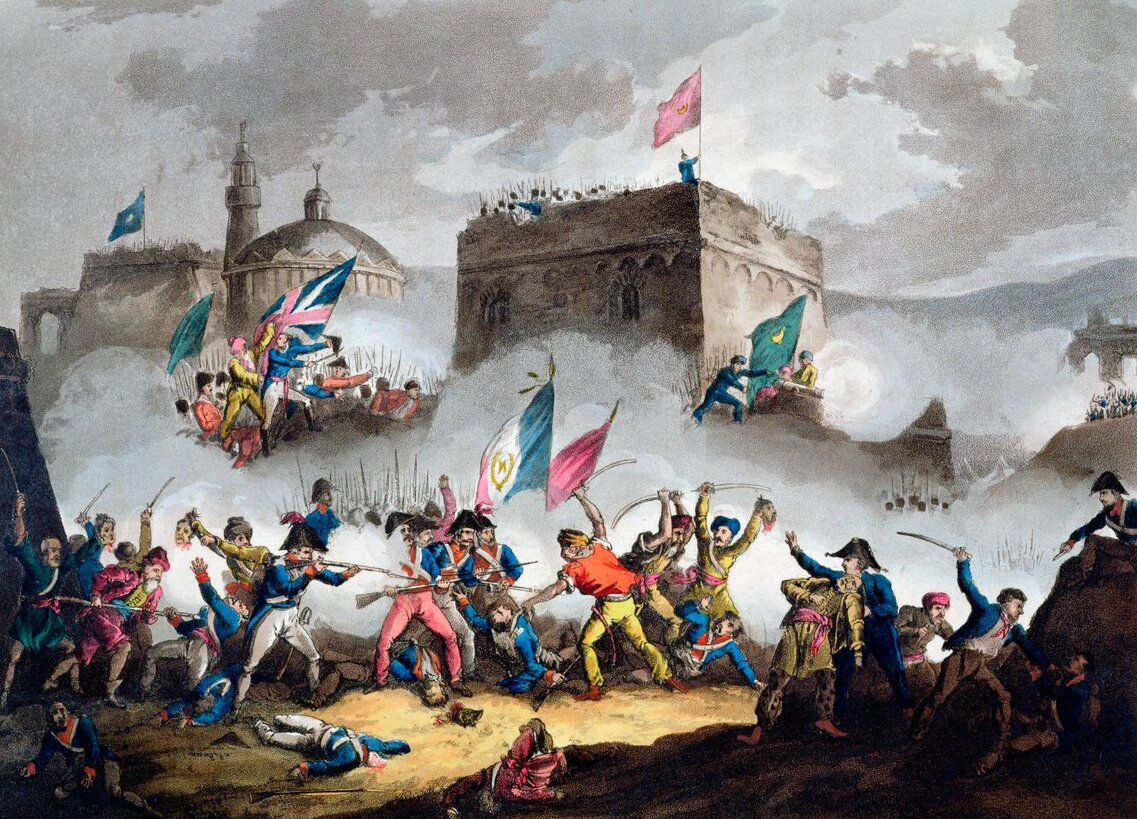
Siege of Acre
(Defence of the breach at St Jean dAcre May 8th 1799 by Thomas Sutherland, 1815)

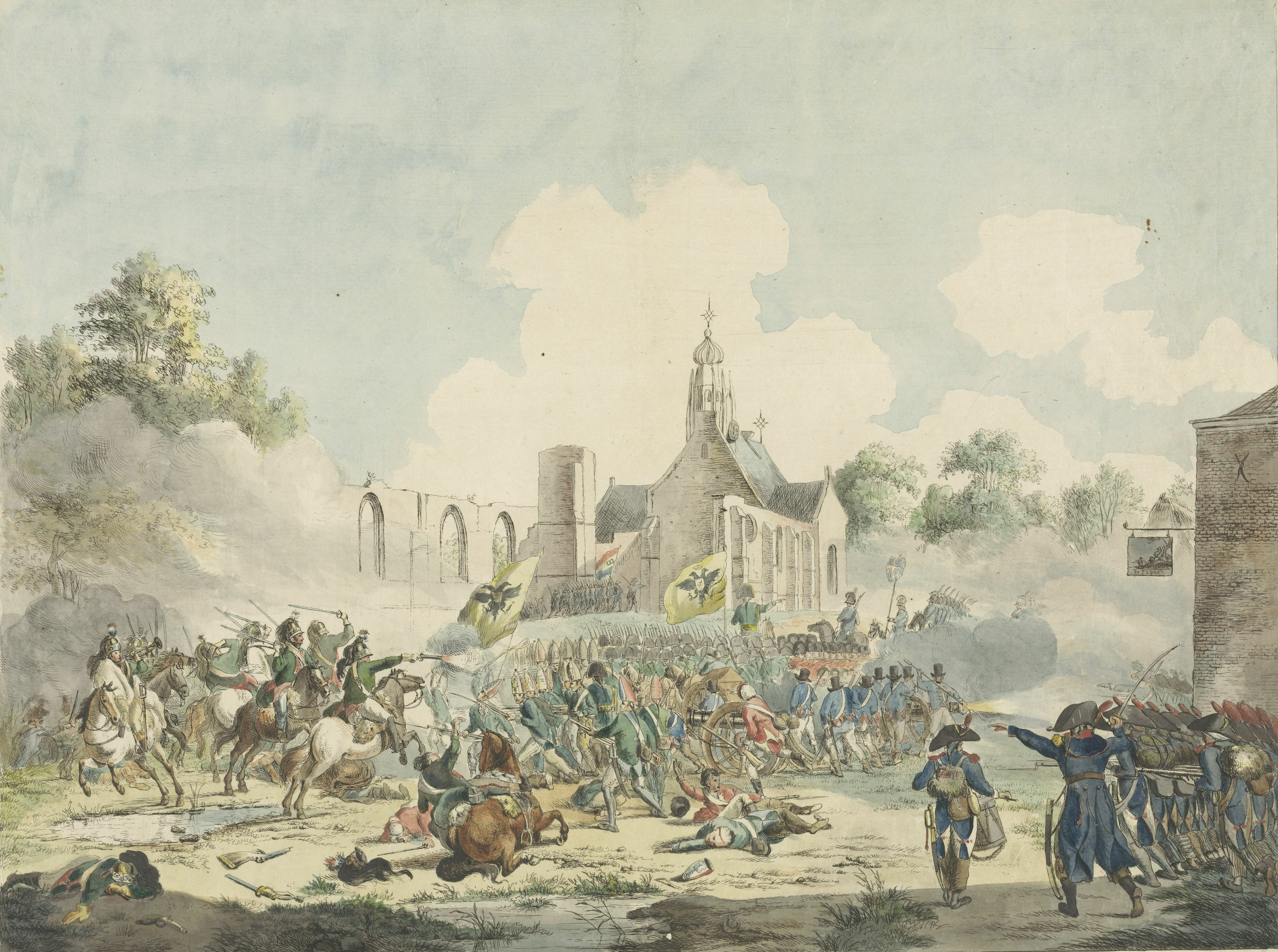
Battle of Bergen
(Slag bij Bergen, 1799 by Pieter Gerardus van Os, 1799)

=== 1799 ===
In Europe, the allies mounted several invasions, including campaigns in Italy and Switzerland and an Anglo-Russian invasion of the Netherlands. Russian general Alexander Suvorov inflicted a series of defeats on the French in Italy, driving them back to the Alps. The allies were less successful in the Anglo-Russian invasion of Holland, where the British and Russians retreated after a defeat at Castricum, and in Switzerland, where after initial victories an Austro-Russian army was completely routed at the Second Battle of Zurich. These reverses, as well as British insistence on searching shipping in the Baltic Sea, led to Russia's withdrawal from the Coalition.

Napoleon invaded Syria from Egypt, but retreated after a failed siege of Acre, and repelling an Ottoman invasion at the Battle of Abukir. Alerted to the political and military crisis in France, he abandoned his army and returned to Europe, and used his popularity and army support to mount a coup that made him First Consul, the head of the French government.

=== 1800 ===
1800 campaigns

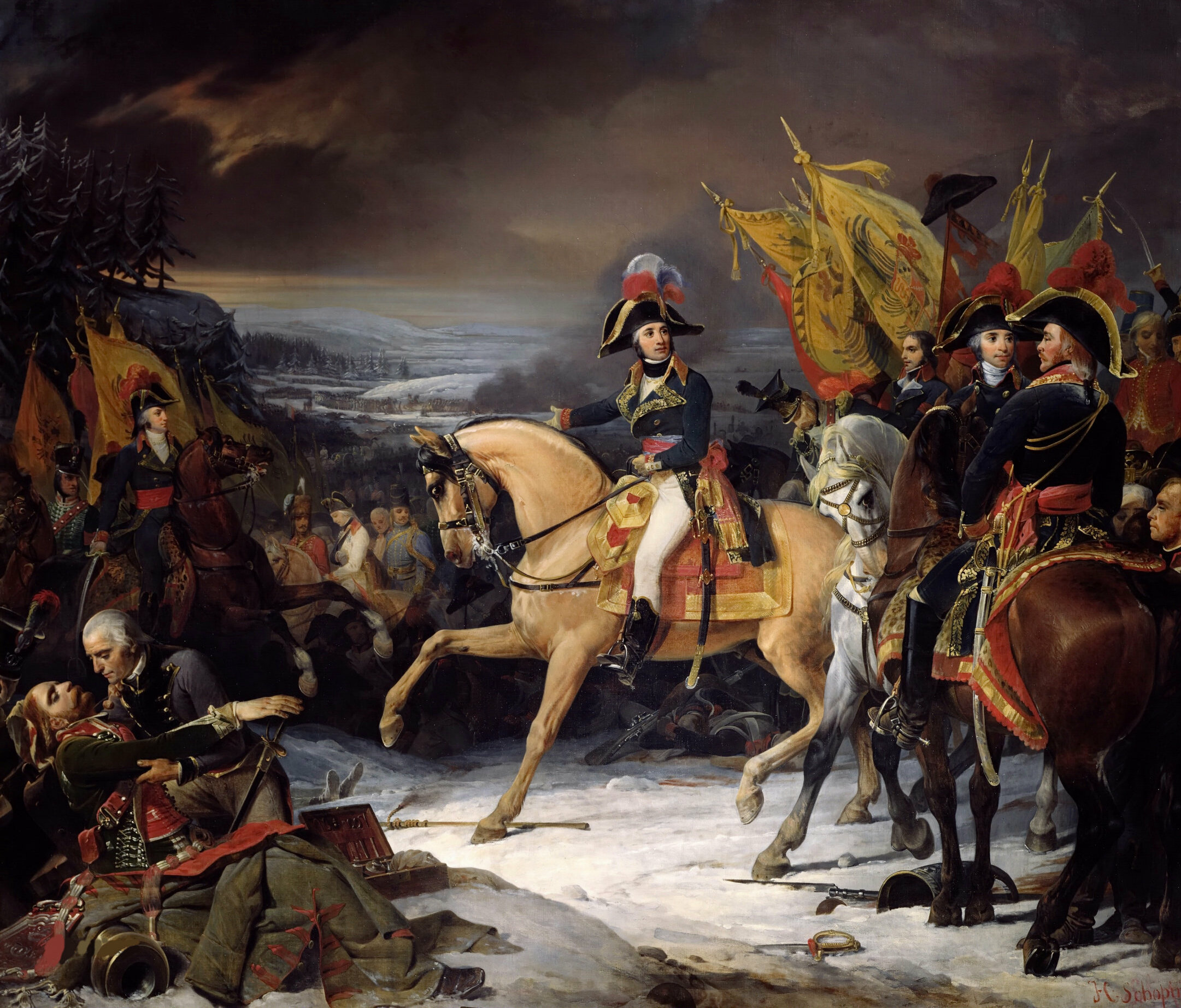
The Battle of Hohenlinden by Henri Frédéric Schopin, 1836. General Moreau at the Battle of Hohenlinden

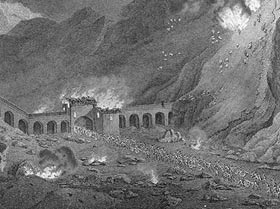
Siege of Fort Bard

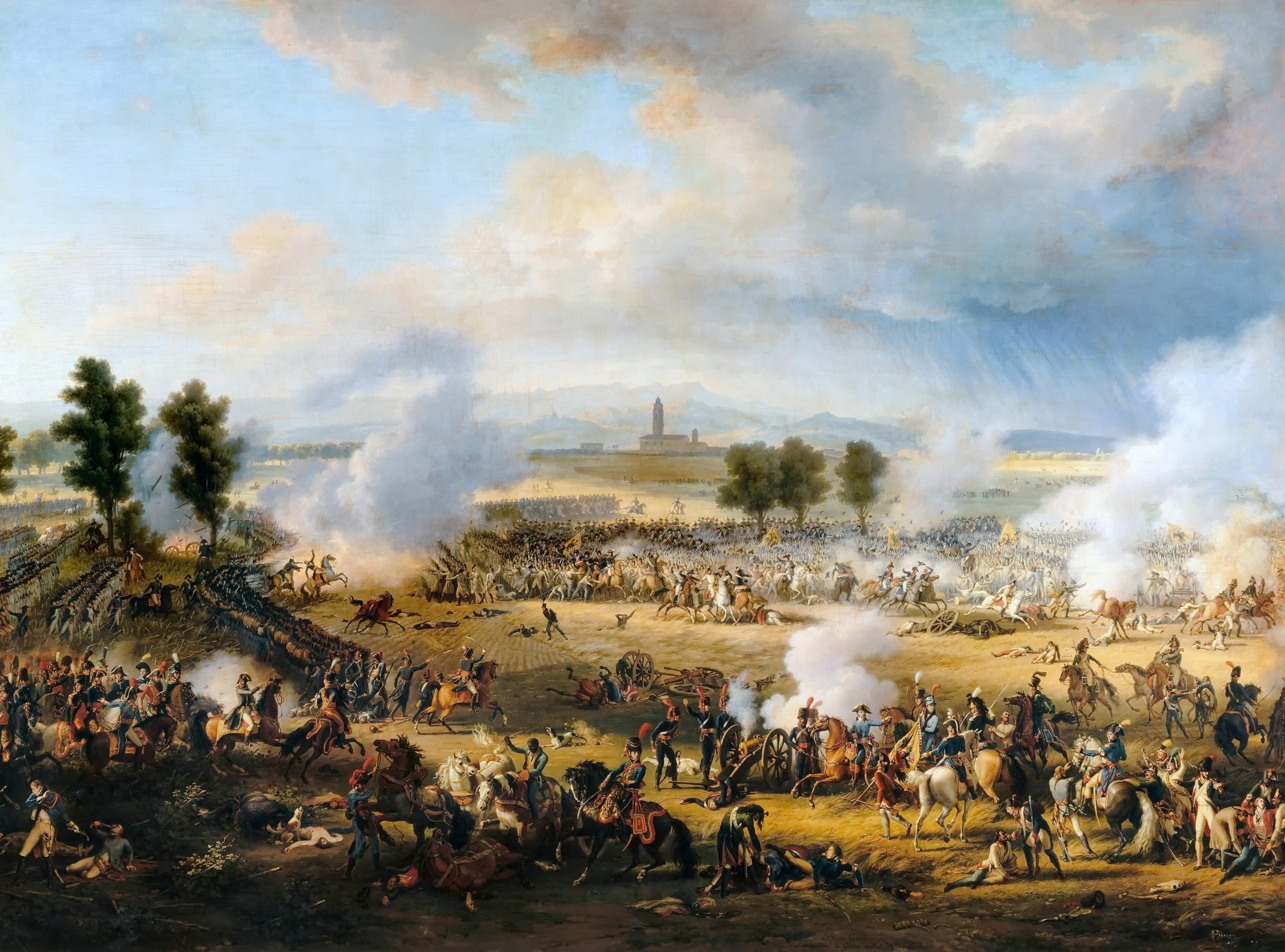
The Battle of Marengo by Louis-François Lejeune, 1801. General Desaix at the Battle of Marengo

Napoleon sent Moreau to campaign in Germany, and went himself to raise a new army at Dijon and march through Switzerland to attack the Austrian armies in Italy from behind.

Moreau meanwhile invaded Bavaria and won a great battle against Austria at Hohenlinden. He continued toward Vienna and the Austrians sued for peace. The result was the Armistice of Steyr on 25 December.

In May 1800, Napoleon led his troops across the Alps through the Great St. Bernard Pass into Italy in a military campaign against the Austrians. He conducted the Siege of Fort Bard against the Sardinian and Austrian armies for two weeks, after which he was able to cross the Alps and enter Italy. He narrowly defeated the Austrians at the Battle of Marengo. While the Austrians had a much larger force, Napoleon was able to organise a hurried retreat from the village before returning with reinforcements. The French successfully charged the Austrian flank with cavalry and Napoleon negotiated for Austria to evacuate Piedmont, Liguria and Lombardy.

=== 1801 ===
1801 campaigns

Battle of Copenhagen

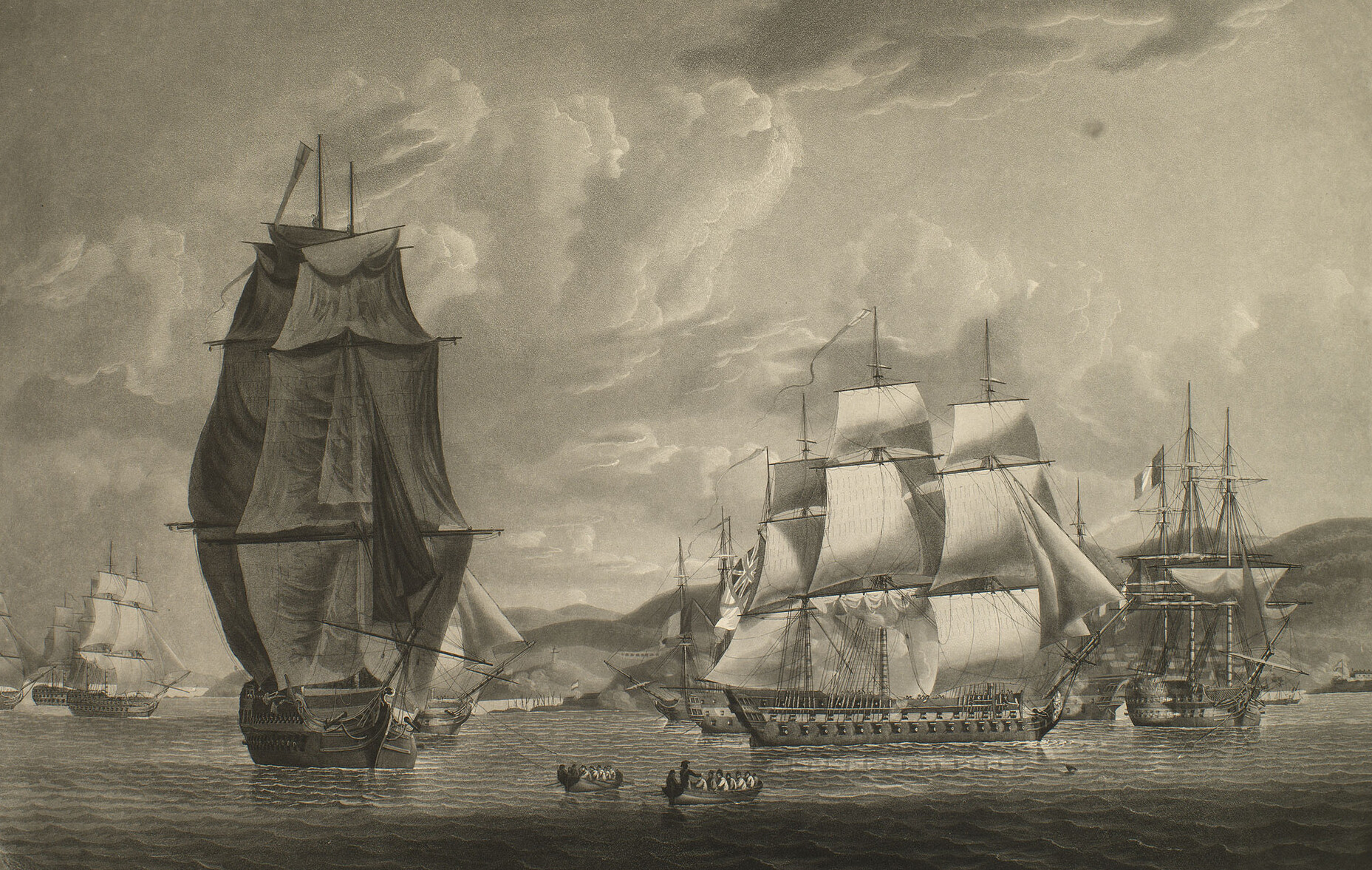
First Battle of Algeciras

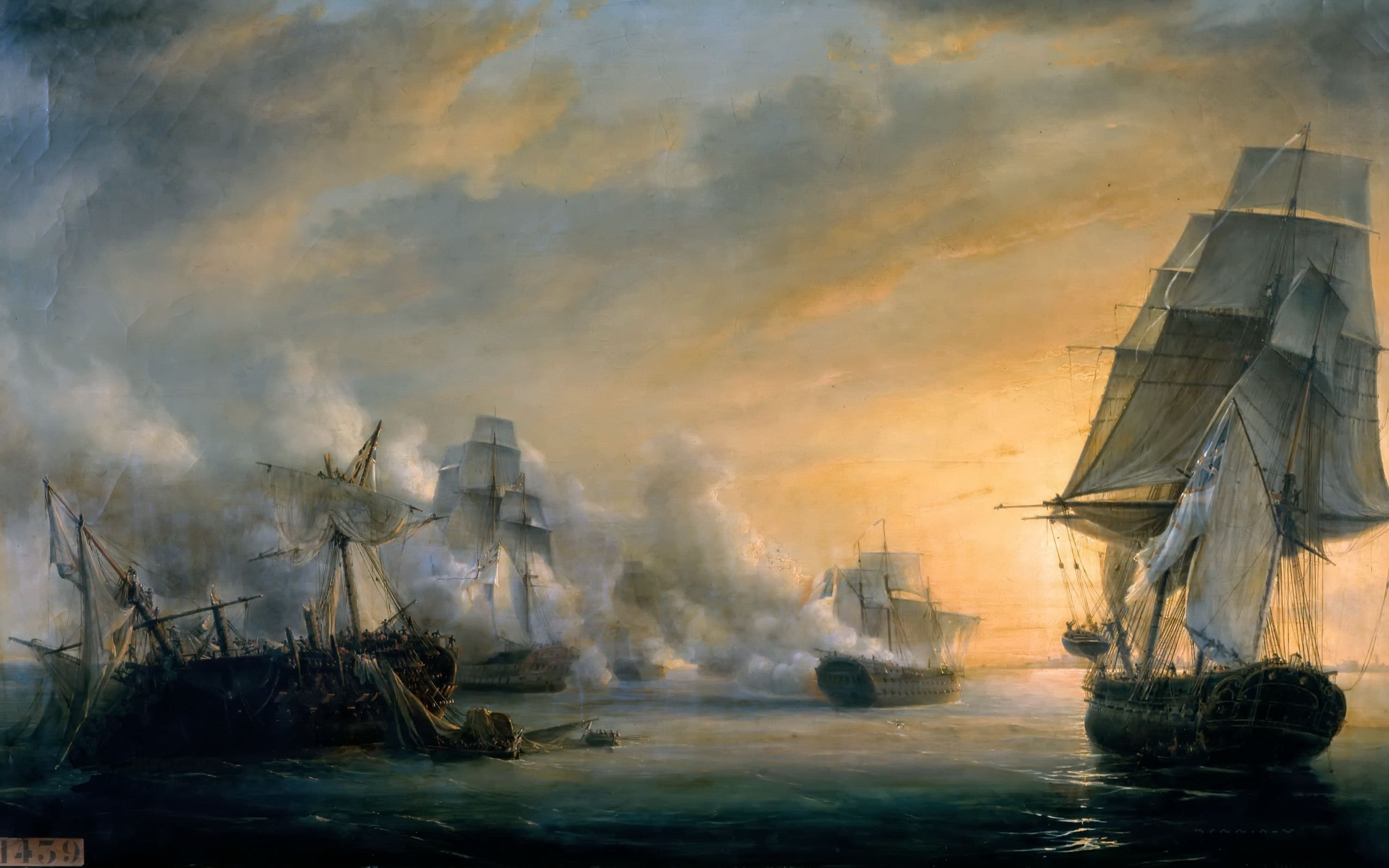
Second Battle of Algeciras

Prior to the Acts of Union of July/August 1800, which came into effect on 1 January 1801, Ireland was a separate kingdom, with its own parliament, held in a personal union with Great Britain under the Crown. In response to the 1798 United Irishmen revolt, it became part of the United Kingdom of Great Britain and Ireland, effective 1 January 1801.

The Austrians signed the Armistice of Treviso on 16 January, ending the war in northern Italy. On 9 February, they signed the Treaty of Lunéville for the entire Holy Roman Empire, basically accepting the terms of the previous Treaty of Campo Formio. In Egypt, the Ottomans and British invaded and compelled the French to surrender after the fall of Cairo and Alexandria.

Britain continued the war at sea. The Second League of Armed Neutrality, which included Prussia, Russia, Denmark–Norway, and Sweden joined to prevent neutral shipping from being stopped by the Royal Navy, resulting in Nelson's successful surprise attack on the Danish fleet in harbour at the Battle of Copenhagen.

France and Spain invaded Portugal in the War of the Oranges, forcing Portugal to sign the Treaty of Badajoz (1801).

Russia formally made peace with France through the Treaty of Paris on 8 October, signing a secret alliance two days later.

In December 1801, France dispatched the Saint-Domingue expedition to recapture the former colony of Saint-Domingue (now Haiti), which had been independent since the 1791 Haitian Revolution. This included over 30,000 troops with many experienced and elite veterans, but ended in catastrophic failure; by the end of 1802, an estimated 15,000–22,000 had died of disease and yellow fever, among them Napoleon's brother-in-law General Charles Leclerc.

== Aftermath ==
On 25 March 1802, Britain and France signed the Treaty of Amiens, ending British involvement in the war. After a preliminary treaty signed at Paris on 9 October 1801, the Treaty of Paris of 25 June 1802 ended the war between France and the Ottoman Empire, the last remaining member of the Second Coalition. The peace treaties ceded the left bank of the Rhine to France and recognized the independence of the Cisalpine, Batavian and Helvetic republics. Thus began the longest period of peace during the period 1792–1815.

== Strategic analysis ==
American historian Paul W. Schroeder (1987) claimed that, at the time of his writing, most historians – exemplified by Piers Mackesy (1984) – had all too simplistically blamed the Second Coalition's failure on the requirement of "Britain and Russia to trust Austria, when it was obvious that Austria could not be trusted". These historians had assumed that Austria failed to act in accordance with the Coalition's common goal of invading France, ending the Revolution and restoring the Bourbon monarchy, because Vienna was too selfish and too greedy for territorial expansion. Schroeder argued it was not that simple: while Austria's primary war aim was not to overthrow the French Republic, it was reasonable for Vienna to set its own conditions for entering a war with France. The enormous financial debt it still had from the War of the First Coalition jeopardised not just the Habsburg Monarchy's ability to field an army capable of defeating the French, but had also caused hyperinflation and internal instability that risked a revolution inside Austria itself. The Habsburg monarchy's very survival was at stake, and so Emperor Francis II and Thugut resolved not to enter a war in order to defeat France at all costs, but to make Austria come out stronger than it went in. Moreover, Schroeder reasoned that all the other great powers that were negotiating to form the Second Coalition – Russia, Prussia (which ultimately remained neutral), Britain, and the Ottoman Empire – were duplicitous: each was afraid of and scheming against the others to make sure it gained the most from the war and the others would gain little or actually grow weaker with the new postwar balance of power.

== See also ==
- List of battles of the War of the Second Coalition
- Suvorov's Swiss campaign
- War of the First Coalition
- War of the Third Coalition
- Coalition forces of the Napoleonic Wars

== Notes ==
Preceded by Peasants' War (1798)	French Revolution: Revolutionary campaigns War of the Second Coalition	Succeeded by Siege of Acre (1799)
