= Paris Convention on Third Party Liability in the Field of Nuclear Energy =

1960 OECD convention

- Signed: 29 July 1960; 28 January 1964 (addnl Protocol); 16 November 1982 (Protocol); 12 February 2004 (Prototocol)
- Location: Paris, France
- Effective: 1 April 1968 (incl addn Protocol); 7 October 1988 (1982 Protocol); 1 January 2022 (2004 Prototocol)
- Condition: 5 ratifications
- Signatories: 19
- Parties: 16 (Convention incl 1960 and 1982 protocols); 16 (Protocol)
- Depositary: Secretary-General of the Organisation for European Economic Co-operation presently: Secretary-general of the OECD
- Languages: English, French, German, Spanish, Italian and Dutch

The Paris Convention on Third Party Liability in the Field of Nuclear Energy is a 1960 OECD Convention on liability and compensation for damage caused by accidents occurring while producing nuclear energy. The convention entered into force on 1 April 1968 and has been amended by protocols in 1964, 1982, and 2004. The convention, as amended by the 1964 and 1982 protocols have 16 parties. The 2004 protocol has not entered into force. Austria and Luxembourg signed the convention but have not ratified it. Switzerland deposited its instruments of ratification for the convention as amended by the 2004 protocol. The convention will entered into force for this country when the 2004 protocol entered into force in 2022.

The convention:

- Limits liability to a certain amount and limit the period for making claims;
- Require insurance or other surety by operators;
- Channels liability exclusively to the operator of the nuclear installation;
- Impose strict liability on the nuclear operator, regardless of fault, but subject to exceptions.
- Grants exclusive jurisdiction to the courts of one country, normally the country in whose territory the incident occurs

== Parties ==
A list of Parties to the convention (as amended by the 1964 and 1982 protocols), the 2004 protocol, as well as the Brussels protocol and the Joint protocol is shown below:

| Country | Convention incl 1964 and 1982 Protocol | 2004 Protocol | Brussels Protocol | Brussels Protocol 2004 amendment | Joint Protocol | (Territorial) application |
|---|---|---|---|---|---|---|
| Belgium | 3 August 1966 | — | 20 August 1985 | 1 January 2022 | — | |
| Denmark | 4 September 1974 | — | 4 September 1974 | 1 January 2022 | 26 May 1989 | incl. Greenland (excl 1982 Protocol) |
| Finland | 16 June 1972 | — | 14 January 1977 | 1 January 2022 | 3 October 1994 | |
| France | 9 March 1966 | — | 30 March 1966 | 1 January 2022 | — | incl 16 territories (excl Brussels Protocol) |
| Germany | 16 June 1972 | — | 1 October 1975 | 1 January 2022 | 13 June 2001 | |
| Greece | 12 May 1970 | — | — | 1 January 2022 | 16 May 2001 | |
| Italy | 17 September 1975 | — | 3 February 1976 | 1 January 2022 | 31 July 1991 | |
| Netherlands | 28 December 1979 | — | 28 September 1979 | 1 January 2022 | 1 August 1991 | European territory only |
| Norway | 2 July 1973 | 26 November 2010 | 7 July 1973 | 26 November 2010 | 11 March 1991 | |
| Portugal | 29 September 1977 | — | — | 1 January 2022 | — | |
| Slovenia | 16 October 2001 | — | 5 June 2003 | 1 January 2022 | 27 January 1995 | |
| Spain | 31 October 1961 | — | 27 July 1966 | 1 January 2022 | — | |
| Sweden | 1 April 1968 | — | 3 April 1968 | 1 January 2022 | 27 January 1992 | |
| Switzerland | 9 March 2009 | 9 March 2009 | — | 9 March 2009 | — | Not applicable |
| Turkey | 10 October 1961 | — | — | 4 January 2022 | 26 March 2007 | |
| United Kingdom | 23 February 1966 | Signed but not ratified | 24 March 1966 | 1 January 2022 | Signed but not ratified | incl. British Virgin Islands, (Note: excluding the Brussels Protocol) Cayman Islands, Falkland Islands, (Note: excluding the 1982 Protocol) Gibraltar, Guernsey, Hong Kong, (Note: After the transfer of sovereignty of Hong Kong, the conventions remained in force) Jersey, (Note: excluding the Paris convention and protocols) Isle of Man, Montserrat, Saint Helena, Ascension and Tristan da Cunha |

== See also ==
- Vienna Convention on Civil Liability for Nuclear Damage
- Cost of electricity by source
