= Treaty of Paris (1802) =

1802 Treaty during the War of the Second Coalition

- Type: Peace treaty
- Signed: June 25, 1802
- Location: Paris, Republic of France
- Signatories: Charles Maurice de Talleyrand-Périgord; Mehmet Sait Galip Efendi
- Parties: French First Republic; Ottoman Empire

The Treaty of Paris was signed on 25 June 1802 between the French First Republic, then under First Consul Napoleon Bonaparte, and the Ottoman Empire, then ruled by Sultan Selim III. It was the final form of a preliminary treaty signed at Paris on 9 October 1801 that brought to an end the French campaign in Egypt and Syria and restored Franco-Ottoman relations to their status quo ante bellum. In the treaty, the Ottoman Empire also assented to the Treaty of Amiens (25 March 1802), a peace treaty between France and the United Kingdom, which had followed the surrender of French troops in Egypt to the British at the Capitulation of Alexandria.

Relations between the Ottoman Empire and France had been strained with the French acquisition of the Ionian Islands in 1797, and the consequent anti-Ottoman propaganda disseminated in the Balkans by French agents. When the French invaded Egypt, the Ottomans declared war (9 September 1798) and subsequently signed a treaty of alliance with Russia (23 December). This was the beginning of the Second Coalition. During the war, the Ionian Islands were re-conquered with Russian help and a Republic under Ottoman suzerainty set up.

The treaty uses three systems of dating: the French Revolutionary calendar, the Islamic calendar and the Gregorian calendar. The French signatory was Charles Maurice de Talleyrand-Périgord and the Ottoman was Seyyid Mehmed Said Galip Efendi. After the treaty, the Ottomans retained good relations with the French. Additional commercial agreements were signed with the Ottoman states of the Barbary Coast: Algeria, Tunisia and Libya.

== Text ==
- Text online

Preceded by Treaty of Amiens	French Revolution; Treaty of Paris (1802)	Succeeded by Battle of Diamond Rock
