= Brussels Conference =

Brussels Conference may refer to:

- the Brussels Anti-Slavery Conference 1889–90
- the Brussels Conference (1892), the fourth and last of the 19th-century International Monetary Conferences
- the Brussels Conference (1920), the next International Monetary Conference
- the Brussels Conference on Syria and the Region, held annually from 2017

== See also ==
- International Monetary and Economic Conferences
