= London Economic Conference =

World conference of 1933

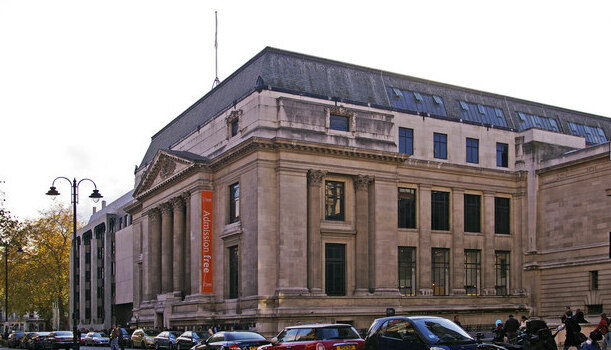
Geological Museum building, London

The London Monetary and Economic Conference of 1933, also known as the London Economic Conference, was a meeting of representatives of 66 nations from June 12 to July 27, 1933, at the Geological Museum in London. Its purpose was to win agreement on measures to fight the Great Depression, revive international trade, and stabilize currency exchange rates.

It collapsed after it was "torpedoed" by US President Franklin D. Roosevelt in early July when he denounced currency stabilization.

== Background ==
When the Great Depression devastated the world economy from 1929 to 1932, it was generally assumed that the United States would serve as a hegemon, providing leadership for a program to bring about recovery. US President Herbert Hoover in 1931 called for a conference to decide how to reduce tariffs and also revive prices by reversing the deflation associated with the Depression. The agenda for the Conference was drafted by representatives of six major nations who met in Geneva in 1932. The agenda asserted that intergovernmental debts should be settled, as they represented a major obstacle on the road to recovery.

The Europeans believed that "the settlement should relieve the world" of the crushing debt burdens. However, most of these debts were owed to the US, which was reluctant to write them off. US Senator William Edgar Borah held that "the troubles of the world were really due to the War, and to the persistence of Europe in keeping great armaments, and to the mismanagement of money" and so he was not willing to postpone, reduce, or cancel the payment of debts "and have Europe go ahead with a programme which has practically sunk the world into its present economic condition."

Other events indicated that the US would not support the Conference agenda as outlined. Roosevelt declared during his inaugural speech, "I shall spare no effort to restore world trade by international economic readjustment, but the emergency at home cannot wait on that accomplishment." That was a clear signal to those in the Conference that Roosevelt would carry out his program to revive the American economy regardless of or even against international plans to revive the world economy.

Roosevelt took the US off the gold standard in April. In May, the Thomas Amendment to the Agricultural Adjustment Act "required the President to pursue a policy of inflation through the issue of paper money."

== Conference ==
The World Economic Conference of June 1933 was held in the new Geological Museum building in London, which had just been completed and in which the museum collection had not yet been installed. Like the Geneva World Economic Conference (1927), it was formally sponsored by the League of Nations, but its idea had originated outside of the League framework at the Lausanne Conference of 1932. Staff of the League's Economic and Financial Organization (EFO) had severe misgivings about the initiative, as they correctly anticipated it might end in disaster.

In the event, it crystallized the impossibility of taking forward the orthodox agenda of the Brussels, Genoa and Geneva conferences under the new financial and political circumstances following the European banking crisis of 1931 and the takeover of Germany by the Nazi Party. The conference program piously invoked the aim of free international movement of "goods, services, and capital" but gave no mandate to the EFO or any other institution to enforce it, a situation which contributed to Roosevelt's intervention against "the fetishes of so-called international bankers".

== Roosevelt's intervention ==
When the conference opened on June 12, 1933, all attention rested on the tripartite currency discussions happening outside it. The big issue was the exchange rate of the US dollar against foreign currencies, such as the British pound and French franc. Many in the US favored devaluation of the dollar to improve the US trade position. France and Britain wanted to stabilize the dollar rate by fixing it at a relatively-high value.

US Secretary of State Cordell Hull led the American delegation to the conference. Roosevelt ordered Hull not to enter into any discussions on currency stabilization. However, when the Conference had gathered, Roosevelt changed his mind by supporting currency manipulation to raise prices and having American banking experts Oliver Mitchell Wentworth Sprague and James Paul Warburg conduct currency stabilization talks with their British and French counterparts. By June 15, Sprague, Warburg, Montagu Norman of the Bank of England, and Clement Moret of the Bank of France had drafted a plan for temporary stabilization.

Word of the plan leaked out. The reaction in the US was negative, the dollar rose against foreign currencies, threatening US exports, and stock and commodity markets were depressed.

Although Roosevelt was considering shifting his policy to a new median dollar-pound rate, he eventually decided not to enter into any commitment, even a tentative one.

On June 17, fearing the British and the French would seek to control their own exchange rates, Roosevelt rejected the agreement in spite of his negotiators' pleas that the plan was only a temporary device, which was full of escape clauses.

On June 30, Roosevelt went further. In an interview with four reporters, he openly criticized stabilization. On July 3, he issued a message to the conference that condemned its efforts at stabilization when "broader problems" existed and asserted that the exchange rate of a nation's currency was less important than other economic values.

Roosevelt's rejection of the agreement gathered an overwhelmingly-negative response from British, French, and US internationalists. British Prime Minister Ramsay MacDonald feared that "Roosevelt's actions would destroy the Conference" and Georges Bonnet, rapporteur of the French Monetary Commission, is said to have "exploded."

Critics see nationalism as a key factor in Roosevelt's decision. However, the British economist John Maynard Keynes hailed Roosevelt's decision as "magnificently right" and the US economist Irving Fisher wrote to Roosevelt that the message "makes me the happiest of men."

== Hugenberg controversy ==
Another area of dispute was created by the head of the German delegation, Economics Minister, Alfred Hugenberg, who put forth a program of German colonial expansion in both Africa and Eastern Europe as the best way of ending the Great Depression, which created a major storm at the conference. For being indiscreet enough to advance the claim to Germany's Lebensraum (living space) while Germany was still more or less disarmed, Hugenberg was sacked from the German cabinet by Adolf Hitler.

== See also ==
- International Monetary and Economic Conferences
