= Economic and Financial Organization of the League of Nations =

Body of the League of Nations

- Organisation économique et financière
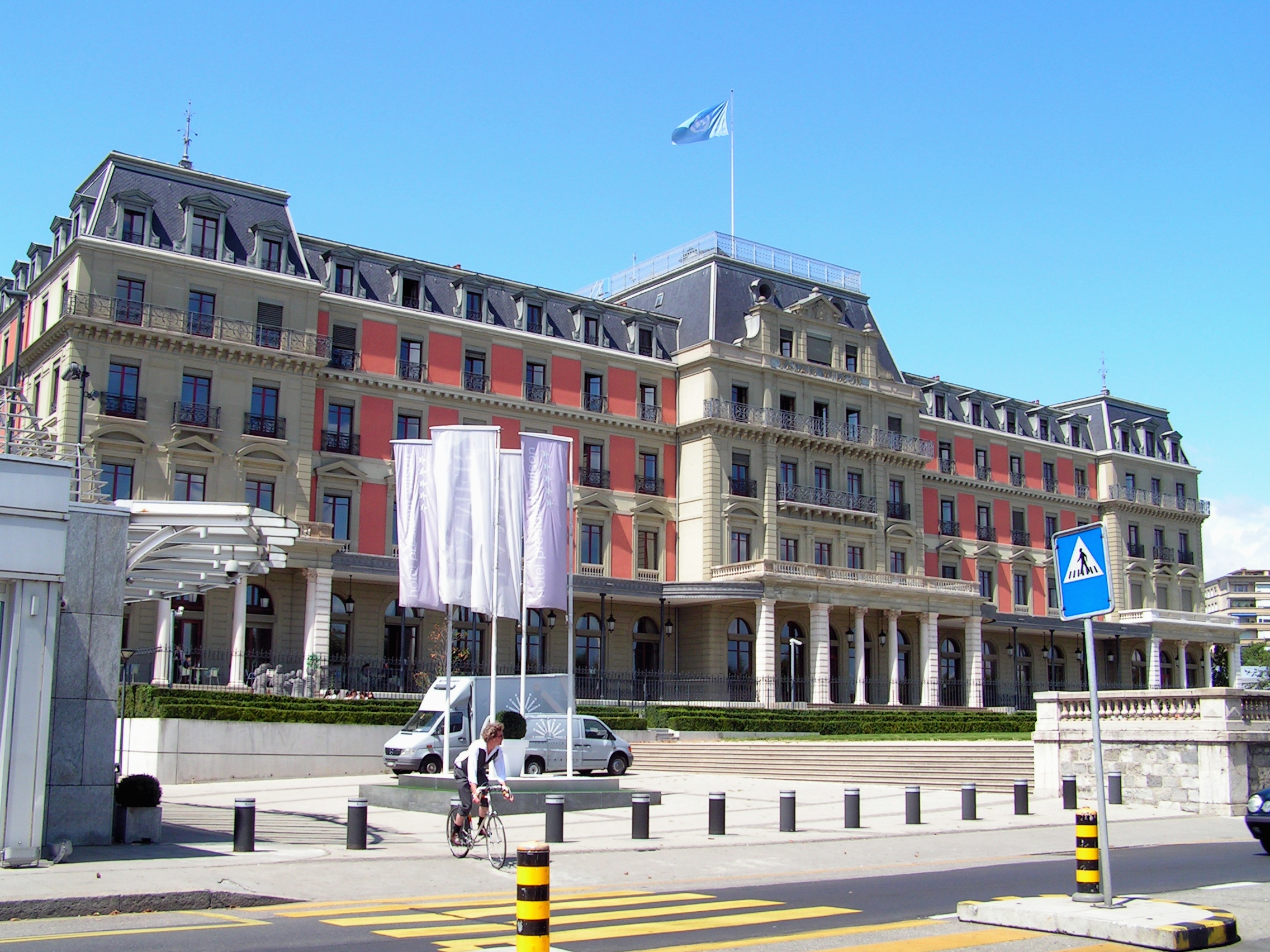
- The Palais Wilson in Geneva, where the Economic and Financial Organization staff worked from 1920 to 1936
- Abbreviation: EFO
- Successor: United Nations
- Formation: 1920
- Dissolved: 1945; 81 years ago
- Parent organization: League of Nations

The Economic and Financial Organization (EFO, French: Organisation économique et financière) was the largest of the technical arms of the League of Nations, and the world's first international organization dedicated to promoting economic and monetary co-operation. It took shape in the early 1920s and was in activity until the creation of the United Nations in 1945. It has been described as having had seminal influence on postwar economic institutions, notably the International Monetary Fund (IMF).

== Background ==
The establishment of the EFO took place in the aftermath of unprecedented transnational cooperation initiatives among allied powers during World War I, which were also pioneering experiments in planned economy imposed by the circumstances. These included the Wheat Executive established in late 1916, and the Allied Maritime Transport Council established in late 1917. They had brought together enterprising civil servants such as Italy's Bernardo Attolico, France's Jean Monnet, and Britain's Arthur Salter, who would play key roles in the war's aftermath. In February 1919, the Paris Peace Conference established a Supreme Economic Council to manage the postwar economic emergencies, but that was soon undermined by a growing division of views between France and Italy on one side, advocating a continuation of the wartime joint action, and the UK and U.S. on the other side, preferring a rapid return to market-oriented business as usual.

In late 1919, Dutch financial community leaders Gerard Vissering and Carel E. ter Meulen organized two conferences in Amsterdam whose participants included economists Gustav Cassel and John Maynard Keynes. On the basis of their conclusions that a collective intergovernmental effort was needed to remedy the postwar disruptions, a petition circulated in January 1920 by the Times in the UK and the New York Times in the U.S. collected 150 signatures of luminaries such as Gustave Ador, Robert Cecil, Arthur Twining Hadley, Herbert Hoover, J. P. Morgan Jr., Fridtjof Nansen, Richard Vassar Vassar-Smith, Paul Warburg, and others including from Denmark and France, an early example of cross-national advocacy. In early February, the British government made it known that it would favor the convening of an international conference by the League of Nations, which had just been formally established in January 1920. The League Council endorsed that proposal during a meeting in London on 13 February 1920, setting the scene for the Brussels Conference that would be held in September–October 1920.

== Establishment and setup ==
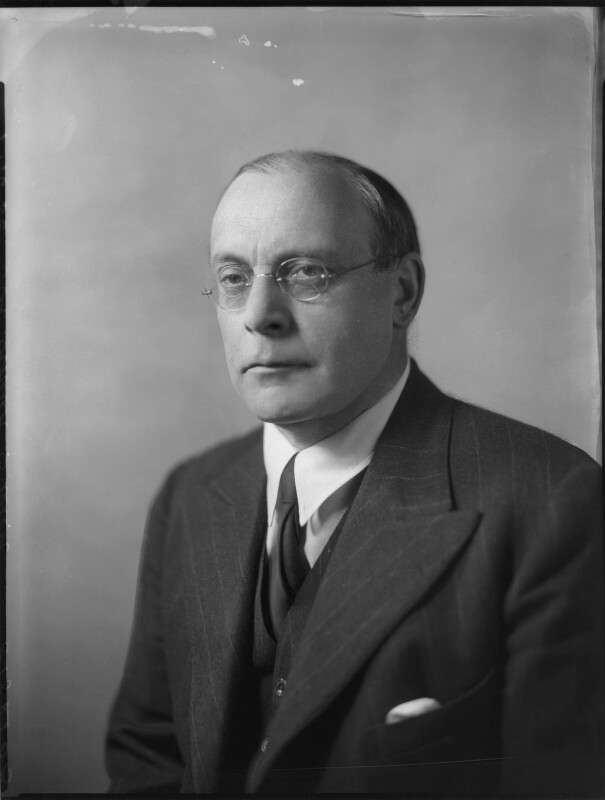
Arthur Salter was the head of the EFO during its heyday from 1922 to 1931

In 1919, a prefiguration team of the League, located at 117 Piccadilly in London, had started to collect and publish economic statistics, which remained the initial focus of the Economic and Financial Section that was soon established within the League Secretariat, and spent much of 1920 preparing the conference. Walter Layton led that fledgling team and moved with it to Geneva in the course of 1920. Per Jacobsson joined the staff in April 1920. In 1922, Salter took over from Layton's acting successor Frank H. Nixon, and led the EFO until 1931, expanding its staff from seventeen to sixty during that period. By then, it was significantly larger than any other section of the League Secretariat.

Following a recommendation of the Brussels Conference, the League's inaugural Assembly meeting in November 1920 endorsed the expansion of the scope into an organization that would be able to formulate policy recommendations to member (and non-member) states, despite initial misgivings from the United Kingdom. On that basis, the League established a Joint Provisional Economic and Financial Committee (French: Commission économique et financière provisoire) composed of experts nominated by the League's Council, and thus not officially representing their respective governments. After that, the EFO's work agenda was determined by the Second Committee of the League's Assembly, which dealt with all so-called technical issues (under the formal authority of the League's Council) and met once every year in September.

In 1923, the Provisional Committee was made permanent and divided into an Economic Committee, dealing primarily with matters of trade and industry organization and composed mostly of government officials, and a Financial Committee focused on monetary and fiscal issues with a greater participation of central and private bankers. The two committees' setup was flexible and inclusive enough that American delegates participated in them from 1927 despite the fact that the U.S. was not a member of the League. Similarly, Japanese delegate remained on the two Committees for some time after Japan withdrew from the League in 1933. The Economic Committee was granted permanent formal status within the League in 1927, initially with a membership of 15 that grew over subsequent years, and the Financial Committee in 1937. In the meantime the Financial Committee kept a smaller size of 10 members, who typically came from central banks and finance ministries of member states and the U.S.; Belgium, France and the UK were represented in it by finance ministry officials, while Switzerland and the Netherlands delegated private-sector and central bankers.

There were also a number of sub-committees of fixed duration, frequently including leading economists of the time, and standing committees on fiscal and statistical matters. The organisational setup of the EFO, like that of the League of Nations in general, was deliberately obscure as the related opacity of decision-forming was viewed as helpful to manage the sensitive matters of economic and financial diplomacy.

=== Financial Committee membership ===
As of late 1923, the Financial Committee's members included

- Albert-Édouard Janssen (National Bank of Belgium)
- Otto Niemeyer (Bank of England)
- South African financier Henry Strakosch
- Dutch financier Carel ter Meulen
- Italian banker Giuseppe Bianchini
- Jean Parmentier (French Finance Ministry)
- Vilém Pospíšil (Czechoslovak Finance Ministry)
- Sekiba Teiji (Japanese delegate at the Reparation Commission).

A decade later, the Committee still included Janssen (as Chair), Niemeyer, Strakosch, and ter Meulen, as well as

- French finance ministry official Gabriel Dayras
- German banker Paul Kempner
- Polish economist Feliks Młynarski
- Norges Bank governor Nicolai Rygg
- the Bank of Japan's Shimasuye Shozo
- Argentine banker Carlos Tornquist
- Italian lawmaker Cesare Tumedei.

Niemeyer, Strakosh and ter Meulen, who had been core committee members from the outset, all resigned in 1937, together with Młynarski.

The other individuals who sat on the Provisional Economic and Financial Committee between 1920 and 1923 and/or on the Financial Committee between 1923 and 1931 were

- Aoki Takeshi (Bank of Japan)
- Arai Kentarō (Japanese Finance Ministry)
- Joseph Avenol (French Finance Ministry)
- Federico Ettore Balzarotti (Credito Italiano)
- Basil Blackett (British Treasury)
- Louis de Chalendar (French Finance Ministry)
- Léopold Dubois (Swiss Bank Corporation)
- José Manuel Figueras Arizcun (Banco de Bilbao)
- Emil Glückstadt (Danske Landmandsbank)
- Omer Lepreux (National Bank of Belgium)
- Carl Melchior (M. M. Warburg & Co.)
- Mori Kengo (Japanese Finance Ministry)
- American lawyer Jeremiah Smith Jr
- Fulvio Suvich (Italian Finance Ministry)
- Tsushima Juichi (Japanese financial attaché in London)
- Marcus Wallenberg Sr (Stockholms Enskilda Bank).

== International financial and economic conferences ==
The EFO was the linchpin of the four interwar international financial and economic conferences, namely the Brussels Conference of 1920, the Genoa Conference of 1922, the Geneva Conference of 1927, and the London Conference of 1933, even though only the latter two were formally organized under the League's aegis. In the first three, the EFO was broadly successful at cementing an international policy consensus on the underpinnings of financial stability, including sound fiscal management and independent central banks, even though it made less headway towards restrictions on cartels and trade protection. One flaw of the EFO doctrine, however, was insufficient insistence on banking supervision, in part a reflection of the fact that the United States, which had the most advanced supervisory practices of the time, was not a member of the League. Partly for that reason, the European banking crisis of 1931 shattered the 1920s orthodoxy, leading to the complete failure of the London Conference in June 1933 after which the League made no further similar attempts.

The League also sponsored a less ambitious International Conference for the Simplification of Customs Formalities, which was held in Geneva from October 15 to November 3, 1923.

== Stabilization loans in the 1920s ==
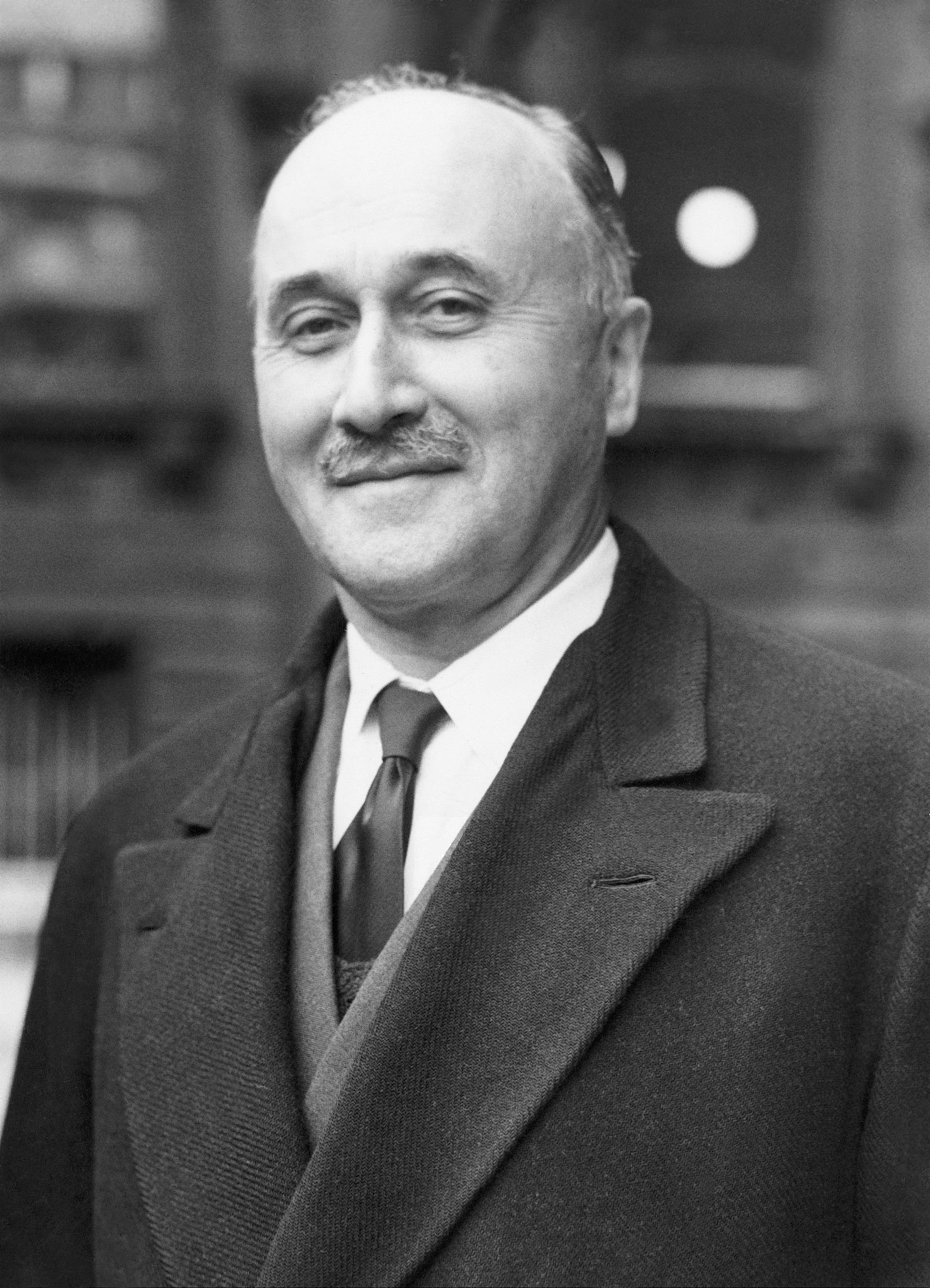
Jean Monnet was the main architect of the League's loan framework pioneered with Austria in 1922–1923

Unlike the postwar IMF, which has significant resources of its own, the EFO itself had no financial firepower but could resolve collective action problems among private investors and governments that desired to foster financial stability but were unable or unwilling to do so on a purely bilateral basis. Its first endeavor, albeit of limited impact, came in early 1922 with support to a loan to Czechoslovakia led by Baring Brothers.

=== Austria ===
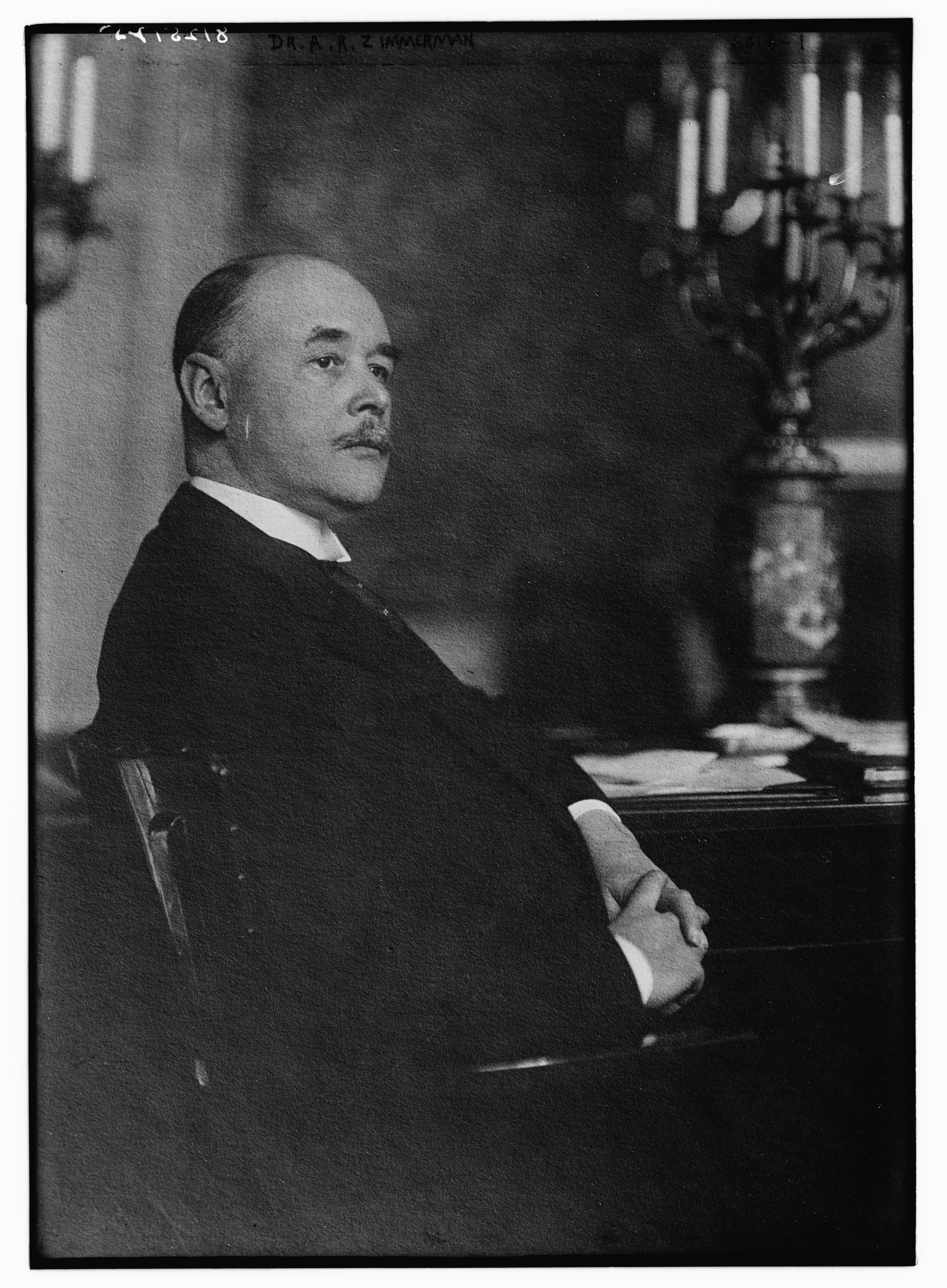
A.R. Zimmerman, previously mayor of Rotterdam, was the League's Commissioner-General in Austria

The EFO's first real action came later in 1922 with the financial distress of Austria, which was considered desperate enough that the allied powers did not want to take responsibility for it themselves. Austria was buffeted between the competing interests of Britain (which had high credit exposure to it), France (which was obsessed with the prospect of German-Austrian unification), Czechoslovakia and Italy (which had competing designs on Austria as its respective neighbours on the north and south). Jean Monnet, by then the League's deputy secretary-general, convinced the Council to take on the challenge, in conjunction with eloquent pleas by Austrian Chancellor Ignaz Seipel. Monnet had the intuition that the respective British, French, Czechoslovak and Italian interests could be leveraged into a cooperative plan, and had it conceived during a lakeside gathering with Salter and Basil Blackett. As he put it, "that real danger of foreign intervention could be literally flipped and transformed into a positive endeavor of joint action. It was about channelling the very forces that could have been tempted to take advantage of the crisis into contributing to the preservation of Austrian independence." A special committee on Austria, formed to prepare the assistance program jointly with the Financial Committee of the League, brought together Seipel with Britain's Arthur Balfour, Czechoslovakia's Edvard Beneš, France's Gabriel Hanotaux, and Italy's Guglielmo Imperiali.

The plan, finalized in three protocols signed in Geneva on 4 October 1922, entailed a fiscal and structural adjustment program in line with the principles which League staff had fostered at the Brussels and Genoa Conferences, It foresaw the appointment of a powerful Commissioner-General who would be resident in Austria at the program's inception and control the disbursement of the funds, subject to the execution of the reform commitments. The appointment of the Commissioner-General by the League itself, as opposed to a business person representing the private creditors, was a major innovation which Monnet defended as key to ensure political acceptance. Furthermore and also in line with the Brussels and Genoa consensus, the program included the creation of an independent national central bank along the lines advocated by Montagu Norman. During the program's negotiation in 1922, Norman initially fought for the head of that institution to be a foreigner, but this met considerable political pushback in Vienna. In December 1922, the Austrian government unilaterally decided to appoint local banker Richard Reisch as governor of the Oesterreichische Nationalbank, which was promptly established in January 1923. This conflict delayed the loan's issuance until a compromise was found in the spring of 1923, under which the League would appoint an "adviser" with extensive oversight powers over the central bank's decisions. The £2 million loan was guaranteed by European governments and successfully raised in private markets in May 1923, underwritten by J.P. Morgan & Co. in New York and the Bank of England in London.

=== Other loans ===
After Austria in 1922, similar features were applied to the League-coordinated loans to Hungary (1924), Danzig (1925 and 1927), Bulgaria (1926 and 1928), Estonia (1927), and Greece (1924 and 1928). There were thus nine "League loans" in total, in six countries, for an aggregate amount of £81 million. Of that, nearly half was provided by British investors and nearly one-fifth by American ones, the rest coming from Continental Europe. The Hungarian loan was requested in August 1923 after the Reparation Commission had agreed on the amounts Hungary had to pay. Hungary was perceived to be in a less desperate position than Austria a year earlier, which allowed for issuance without any government guarantee. The League's buildup of credibility made it possible to gradually lower the loans' costs. Portugal explored a similar agreement in 1928 but eventually balked at the onerous conditions, as Albania had done earlier in the decade. In Hungary, Danzig, and Greece, as in Austria, the loans entailed the creation of a new independent central bank, respectively the Hungarian National Bank, Bank of Danzig, and Bank of Greece. In Bulgaria and Estonia, the existing national bank was restructured and made more independent.

In all of these loans except Estonia, a foreign official would control two key accounts on the League's behalf (this was a specifically appointed Commissioner-General in Austria, Hungary and Bulgaria; the League's High Commissioner in Danzig; and the pre-existing International Financial Commission in Greece). First, the external loan account held money provided by the foreign creditors for use by the borrowing government to cover fiscal deficits during the initial phase of transition. Second, the security revenues account held money collected in the borrowing country as so-called security revenues that served as collateral for the foreign loans, typically from customs and/or from state monopolies. In addition to controlling both accounts, the League's Commissioner usually had a veto right over government decisions deemed adverse to the good execution of the program. Separately and complementarily, the program entailed the appointment of a League Adviser to the (generally newly created) national central bank, formally an employee of the central bank but in effect a representative of the League. The Adviser's position was defined in the statutes of the central bank, which were typically drafted directly by the EFO's Financial Committee. It granted him a wide supervisory role over the management and operations of the central bank, sometimes including a veto on the bank's Board decisions. Finally, the program would designate Trustees to administer the security revenues in case of default, except in Greece where it relied on the International Financial Commission. Several of these officials became known as so-called money doctors, an expression that referred more broadly to foreign experts that helped countries improve their financial and especially monetary policies by providing expertise and experience from the national systems viewed as most advanced.

Countries that had recourse to similar borrowing schemes without appealing to the League's assistance, primarily Poland in 1927 and Romania in 1929, struggled to secure financing conditions as good as those under the League's framework, despite the fact that both were advised by Monnet who was by then in private practice. The governance innovations pioneered by the League inspired other loan packages, including the 1924 Dawes Plan for Germany and those of Belgium and Italy in 1926. Overall and from the standpoint of their aims of financial stabilization and economic recovery by means of fundamental change in the fiscal and monetary regimes, the loans were impressively successful.

=== Officials appointed by the League ===
- Commissioner-General in Austria: Alfred Rudolph Zimmerman (Dutch, December 1922 – 1926)
- Adviser at the Austrian National Bank: Charles Schnyder von Wartensee (Swiss, 1923-1924); Anton van Gijn (Dutch, 1924-1925); Robert Kay (American, 1926-1929)
- Commissioner-General in Hungary: Jeremiah Smith Jr. (American, May 1924-June 1926)
- Adviser at the Hungarian National Bank: Harry Arthur Siepmann (British, June 1924 – 1926)
- Commissioner-General in Bulgaria: René Charron (French, 1926-1932); Jean Watteau (French, 1932-1934); Pierre Cheysson (French, 1934-1940)
- Adviser at the Bulgarian National Bank: Jean Watteau (French, 1930-1932); Nikolai Köstner (Estonian, 1932-1940)
- Adviser at the Bank of Greece: William Horace Finlayson (British, 1928-1937)
- Adviser at the Bank of Estonia: Walter James Franklin Williamson (British, 1926-1930)

== European integration advocacy ==
In the late 1920s and early 1930s, partly in response to the surge of U.S. protectionism followed by tariff escalation between the United Kingdom and its European neighbors, the EFO developed tentative ideas about European integration, foreshadowing developments two decades later that would lead to the establishment of the European Coal and Steel Community. Salter and Italy's Pietro Stoppani, who had joined the EFO staff in 1923, reflected on the parallel between Europe and the United States and the case for a large integrated market delivering beneficial economies of scale; Salter used the expression "United States of Europe" in his own writing. In their view, the realistic way to promote that aim was to agree on exceptions to the most favoured nation principle among some or all European countries, a form of trade regionalism, also stimulated by the landmark call for a "European Union" submitted by France's Aristide Briand to 27 European member states of the League in September 1929, and the responses it elicited. In September 1930, the League's Assembly decided to set up a Commission of Inquiry for European Union (French: Commission d'Études pour l'Union Européenne) to elaborate on Briand's proposal, which was chaired by Briand but soon met stalemate in 1931, contributing to Briand's downfall as French foreign minister in January 1932. The EFO's legitimation of European regionalism played a role in stimulating two stillborn projects, the Austro-German Customs Union publicized in March 1931 and the Ouchy Convention of June 1932 between the Belgium–Luxembourg Economic Union and the Netherlands.

== Policy developments in the 1930s ==
After Salter left the League Secretariat in 1931, the negotiation on the appointment of its successor led to the division of the EFO Secretariat into an Economic Section, headed by Stoppani, and a Financial section headed by Britain's Alexander Loveday, who had joined the fledgling League staff at inception in 1919 and had led its statistical endeavors since then. The two sections were eventually reunited in 1939 together with the secretariat of the League's Communications and Transit Organization, under Loveday's leadership as Stoppani retired. Meanwhile, the staff had developed a genuine supranational ethos, as illustrated by the fact that Stoppani ignored Mussolini's instructions to resign after Italy withdrew from the League in 1934. Throughout the 1930s, the EFO displayed intellectual honesty and flexibility by abandoning some of its prior gold standard orthodoxy and advocating policies directed at full employment, echoing the contemporaneous theoretical work of John Maynard Keynes and the Stockholm School of Economics.

Following the shock of the banking crisis of 1931, the EFO managed to mitigate some of the consequences in its program countries of the 1920s, e.g. Austria, Hungary, and Bulgaria. The EFO persuaded existing lenders to apply forbearance and enlisting new ones to refinance the loans, while directly supervising some of the debt-servicing operations.

In general policy matters, as the scope for wide international consensus had shrunk dramatically, the EFO adapted by experimenting with new forms of policy influence. For example, in a work stream on double taxation already started in the late 1920s and sponsored by the Rockefeller Foundation, it prepared model bilateral conventions and sent them to individual governments, rather than convening a conference that would have been unlikely to achieve unanimous agreement; eighty such conventions were subsequently signed between 1929 and 1938. The EFO also had partial success with a number of countries in its advocacy of dismantling foreign exchange controls and restrictive bilateral clearing agreements in the mid-1930s. It also worked on securities fraud, the standardization of loan contracts, and restrictions on the sale of raw materials.

Stoppani and Loveday agreed that matters of international trade and protectionism should be at the forefront of the EFO's agenda. Building upon Salter's shift in 1929 towards acknowledgement of the validity of regionalism, they posited that genuine progress would not involve all member states at the same time but rather occur "between those States where there is a desire to do business" as Loveday put it in a 1938 address. For that reason, EFO staff was wary about the organization of the London Economic Conference, which had been decided outside of the League framework at the Lausanne Conference of 1932 and indeed ended in comprehensive failure. The EFO made renewed advocacy efforts in 1935 and 1936 for a reduction of trade restrictions on the basis of the most favoured nation principle, but that was rejected primarily by Britain, to the frustration of the United States which under Secretary of State Cordell Hull has swung back towards freer trade.

Even so, the League's advocacy, which included a plea for devaluation of the gold bloc currencies, played a key role in the Tripartite Agreement of 1936. The agreement’s text repeated much of prior EFO reports' language, and facilitated the simultaneous French policy pivot towards a more liberal trade stance. From 1937, after the Tripartite Agreement had only produced disappointing results, the EFO endeavored to secure more autonomy for itself within the League that would transform it into an autonomous agency along similar lines as the International Labour Organization, but to no avail in the League's fast-deteriorating environment.

== Economic research and statistics ==
The EFO kept employing numerous talented economists in its staff, such as Gottfried Haberler, Jan Tinbergen, John B. Condliffe, and Ragnar Nurkse. Canada's Louis Rasminsky had joined the EFO in 1930, and would stay until 1939. James Meade served as specialist adviser on behalf of the British government. Jacques J. Polak was on the staff from 1938 to 1943. In the late 1930s, the EFO hired Oskar Morgenstern, Bertil Ohlin, and Jacques Rueff as outside experts for its influential work on economic depressions. Other economists who worked at the EFO and would attain later fame, often at the IMF, included Marcus Fleming, Alvin Hansen, Folke Hilgerdt, and Tjalling Koopmans.

Throughout the 1930s and early 1940s, similarly as the Bank for International Settlements which had started operations in 1930, the EFO also produced major statistical and analytical works, both ad-hoc investigations and periodical series of its specialized arm the Economic Intelligence Service (EIS, French: Service d'études économiques). It pioneered the nascent field of open-economy macroeconomics. From 1933, its research on business cycles was further supported by annual grants from the Rockefeller Foundation. Regular EIS publications included the Statistical Yearbook of the League of Nations, the Monthly Bulletin of Statistics, Money and Banking, the Review of World Trade, and from 1936 on, an annual report on the general economic situation. Many of these series were subsequently continued by the United Nations. The EFO's World Economic Survey, prepared by Condliffe in the early 1930s and then Meade in 1938-1940, has been labeled the ancestor of the IMF's flagship publication World Economic Outlook.

== Wartime relocation and postwar legacy ==
In May 1940, Switzerland was increasingly at risk of being encircled by the Axis powers. Loveday decided to move together with around two-thirds of the EFO staff,, and eventually relocated the organization at the Institute for Advanced Study in Princeton, New Jersey. The Institute's director Frank Aydelotte persuaded the U.S. Department of State about the move, deftly invoking the memory of Woodrow Wilson and his associations with both Princeton and the League, and secured funding from the Rockefeller Foundation. At Princeton, the exiled EFO played a central role in shaping the work of the United Nations Relief and Rehabilitation Administration, established in 1943, and had influence in the preparation of the Bretton Woods Conference and, beyond its own absorption into the United Nations in 1945, the General Agreement on Tariffs and Trade in 1947. Loveday attended Bretton Woods as an external observer, and several former EFO staff were among the national negotiators, including Rasminsky for Canada and Polak for the Netherlands. In the assessment of Louis Pauly, "The final economic studies of the League contributed to a new consensus that ultimately found its authoritative expression in the 1944 Bretton Woods Agreement and in the 1947 Havana Charter". That included, in particular, Nurske's landmark study on the macroeconomic history of the interwar period.

The assessment of the EFO and its impact has ebbed and flowed since its absorption by the nascent United Nations in 1945. In a monograph published shortly afterwards, William Martin Hill, who had joined the EFO staff in 1927, noted that "Consultation between officials engaged in framing and executing economic and social policies in different countries was rare before 1914; through the League it became an established practice". The memory of the EFO and its partial successes was then somewhat obscured during the Cold War period by the incentives to emphasize the League's institutional limitations in contrast with the more robust western postwar order, including by Salter himself in his memoirs published in 1961.

In his 1996 study, Pauly notes the parallels between the successes and limitations of the EFO and those of the IMF, noting that both had to adapt to major financial disruptions, respectively the 1931 crisis and Great Depression, and the Nixon shock of 1971. He argues that both institutions pivoted towards analytical work following the respective setbacks, but also that the memory of the ultimate failure of the League helped the IMF find a new mandate in the 1980s when it played a central role in addressing the Latin American debt crisis. He also notes that neither the League nor the IMF were allowed to intervene directly in situations deemed too critically sensitive by their most powerful stakeholders, such as the German reparations which were (mis)handled in a separate series of international conferences in which the EFO had little or no influence.

More recent scholarship, not least by historian Patricia Clavin, has emphasized the EFO's pioneering initiatives, its policy achievements including during the 1930s, and its role in fostering an epistemic community that would be critically influential in post-World War II developments.

== See also ==
- International Committee on Intellectual Cooperation
- Organisation of the League of Nations
