= International Monetary and Economic Conferences =

Economic conferences from 1867 to 1944

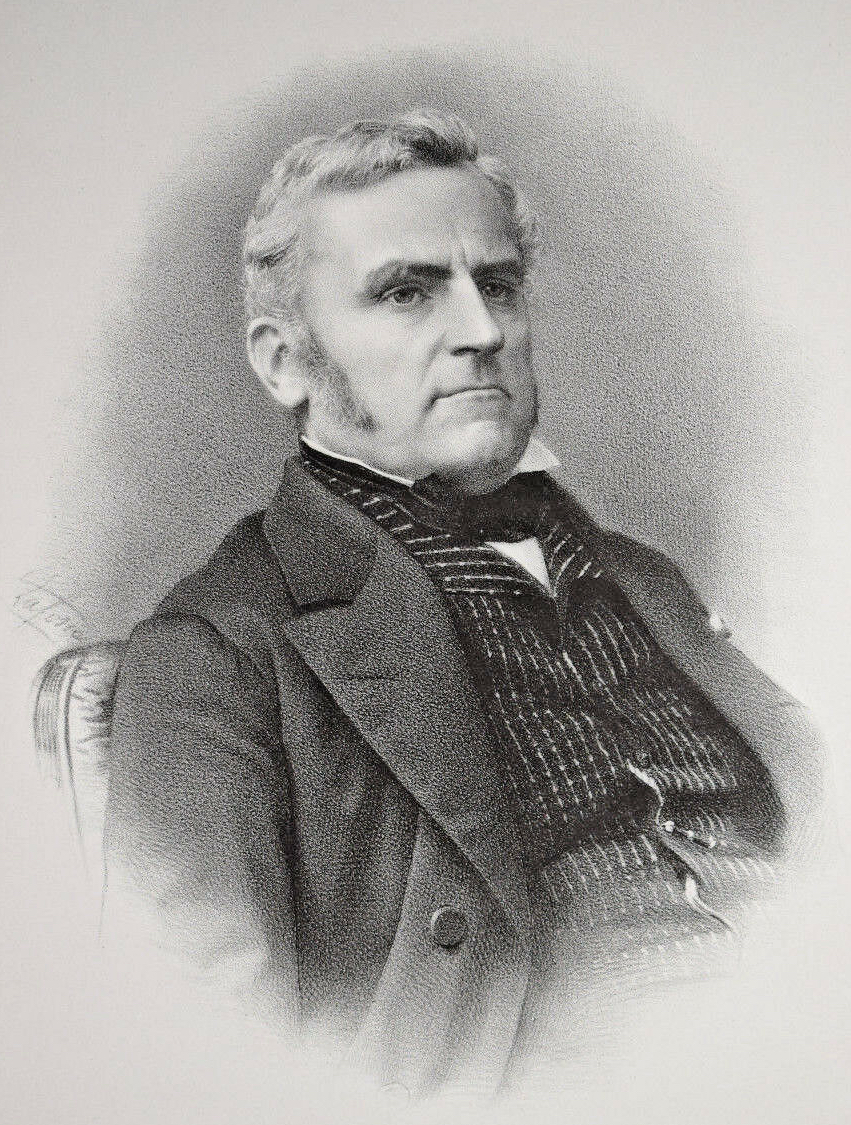
French statesman Félix Esquirou de Parieu (1815-1893) initiated the sequence of international monetary conferences

The international monetary and economic conferences were a series of gatherings held in the last third of the 19th century and the first half of the 20th century, culminating in the Bretton Woods Conference of 1944. The first four conferences in the 19th century focused on matters of coinage and the markets for gold and silver. After World War I, the scope of the conferences was expanded to matters of financial stability, then trade and economics more broadly; the two iterations in 1927 and 1933 were branded World Economic Conference. The latter of these, the London Economic Conference of 1933, ended in significant failure, and the formula of periodical international conferences was subsequently abandoned in favor of the permanent international financial institutions of the post-World War II order.

== Background ==
The disorganized state of the European currencies in the mid-19th century, which became more serious in consequence of the great expansion in trade and industry, came into notice through great gold discoveries such as the California gold rush, and their effect on the relative price of the two precious metals gold and silver. France in 1865 fostered the Latin Monetary Union, whereby its currency and those of Belgium, Italy and Switzerland were unified in respect to their gold and silver coins. The conferences, initially promoted by French statesman Félix Esquirou de Parieu, were an attempt to build on this initial step to secure reforms by concerted international action.

== Conferences ==
The successive conferences were:

- the original International Monetary Conference in Paris (1867; 19 participating jurisdictions)
- the second International Monetary Conference in Paris (1878; 10 participating jurisdictions)
- the third International Monetary Conference in Paris (1881; 15 participating jurisdictions)
- the fourth International Monetary Conference in Brussels (1892; 20 participating jurisdictions)
- the International Financial Conference in Brussels (1920; 39 participating jurisdictions)
- the Economic and Financial Conference in Genoa (1922; 34 participating jurisdictions)
- the World Economic Conference in Geneva (1927; 46 participating jurisdictions)
- the World Economic Conference in London (1933; 66 participating jurisdictions)
- the United Nations Monetary and Financial Conference in Bretton Woods, New Hampshire (1944; 44 participating jurisdictions)

The first conference in Paris essentially paved the way for the generalization of the gold standard, in line with Parieu's policy views. Monetary conditions changed radically in the early 1870s, however, and the next conferences were unsuccessful attempts driven by the United States to restore the fortunes of bimetallism. That endeavor was eventually rendered redundant by the general shift to gold standard. The late 19th century was also a time of rapid development of commercial banking in continental Europe, which led to issues of credit being considered alongside narrowly defined currency matters. At the Brussels conference in 1892, German academic Julius Wolff submitted a blueprint for an international currency that would be used for emergency lending to national central banks and would be issued by an institution based in a neutral country.

An Inter-American Monetary Commission met separately in Washington DC in early 1891, focused on the Western Hemisphere.

In the interwar era conferences, the most sensitive issues among great powers – namely, inter-allied war debts and World War I reparations – were kept off the international conferences' agendas. These issues were addressed instead in a separate cycle of gatherings in smaller format, including the Cannes Conference in 1922, the negotiation of the Dawes Plan in 1924, the Hague conference in 1929-1930 (whose lasting legacy was the Bank for International Settlements that started shortly afterwards in Basel), and the Lausanne Conference in 1932.

== Aftermath ==
The international monetary and economic conferences ultimately failed because they lacked a commitment device to ensure compliance with whatever principles were agreed. From that standpoint, the Bretton Woods Conference of July 1944 can be viewed as both the last of the cycle started in 1867, and the beginning of a new era in which permanent international financial institutions would ensure a better governance of the global monetary, financial and economic system.

In 1954, private bankers convened an International Monetary Conference, which has been held on a yearly basis since then. Officials are invited to speak at that gathering, which is not public and of an entirely different nature from the prior conferences of the same name.

== See also ==
- Tripartite Agreement of 1936
- London Agreement on German External Debts
- International Sanitary Conferences
- First International Statistical Congress
