= Paris Monetary Conference (1881) =

International economic conference

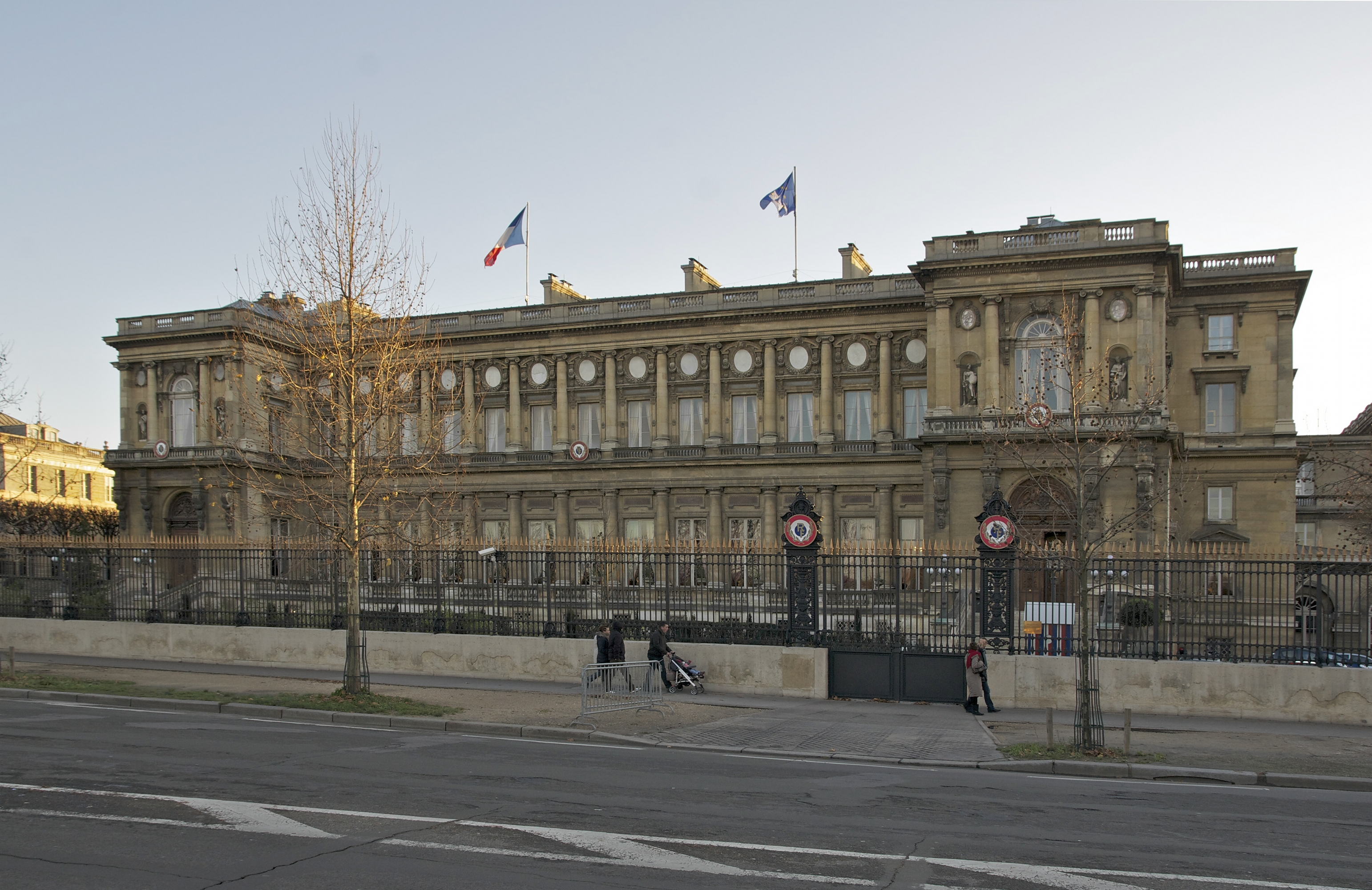
The conference was held in the building of the Ministry of Foreign Affairs on Quai d'Orsay, Paris

The International Monetary Conference of 1881 was the third of a series of international monetary conferences, convened in Paris on 19 April 1881 and adjourned in July of that year. Like the previous iteration in 1878, it failed to achieve a cooperative outcome.

== Overview ==
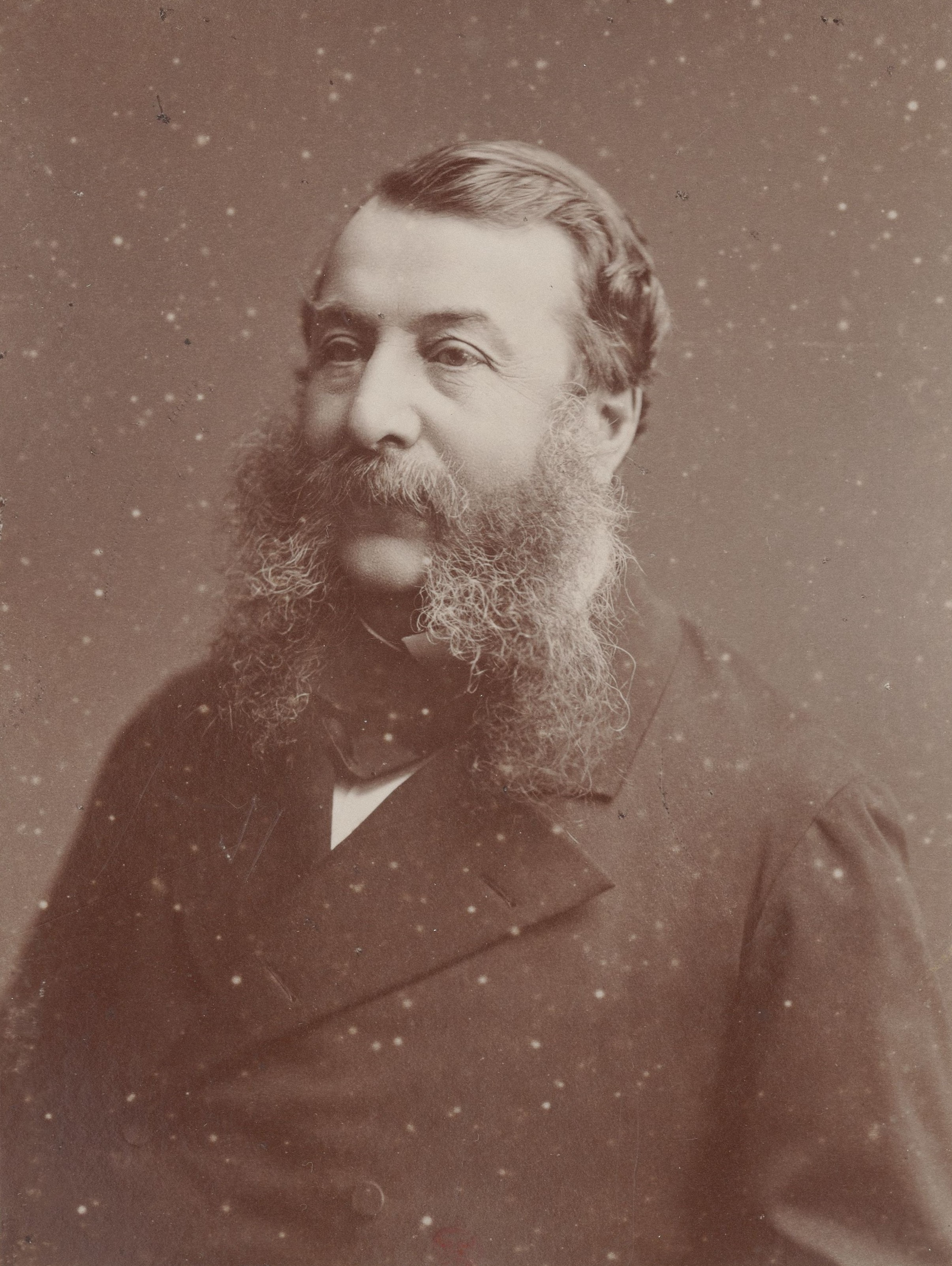
Pierre Magnin (1824-1910), French finance minister and chair of the conference

Due to the continuing fall in the value of silver, the conference was convened jointly by France and the United States. The previous conference in 1878 had been attended by delegates from Austria-Hungary, Belgium, France, Italy, the Netherlands, Russia, Sweden (jointly with Norway), Switzerland, the United Kingdom and the United States. In 1881, five additional nations sent delegates: Denmark, Germany, Greece, Portugal, and Spain, making 15 participating nations in total. The 1881 conference was chaired by French finance minister Pierre Magnin.

At the conference France and the United States gave stronger support to the proposal to restore bimetallism, while the delegates of the smaller European countries were opposed, and Germany refused to promise any cooperation. The conference was therefore adjourned to obtain fresh instructions; but these were never furnished. The conference therefore did not reconvene in April 1882 as envisaged.

== See also ==
- Paris Monetary Conference (1867)
- International Monetary and Economic Conferences
