= Gold bloc =

The gold bloc were seven countries led by France that stuck to the gold standard monetary policy during the Great Depression, even though many other countries abandoned it. In addition to France, the gold bloc included Belgium, Luxembourg, the Netherlands, Italy, Poland, and Switzerland.

== History ==
As the shock from the May 1931 default of Austria's largest commercial bank, Creditanstalt, spread throughout Europe, several countries, most notably Great Britain in September 1931, abandoned the gold standard. Other countries, including Denmark, Norway, Sweden (September 1931), Finland (October), and Japan (December), also abandoned the gold standard.

But the gold bloc countries recommitted themselves to maintain a stable rate of exchange of their currencies at the 1933 international economic conference in London, by which time 35 countries, including the United States and Italy, had abandoned the gold standard. They thus persisted with deflationary policies—i.e., "while foreswearing exchange controls, they raised tariffs and tightened quotas on imports in an effort to insulate their economies from the downturn and protect their gold reserves".

The currency crisis continued after the devaluation of the United States dollar in 1934 and the ongoing devaluation of the British pound sterling. The gold bloc countries' export businesses found it difficult to maintain profitability and suffered from massive capital flight to the United States. Belgium and Luxembourg gave up the gold standard in March 1935 and devalued their currencies. In September 1936, the United States, Great Britain, and France signed the Tripartite Agreement, and finally the remaining gold bloc countries abandoned the gold standard.

== Conclusions ==
Economists writing A Program for Monetary Reform (1939) indicated Scandinavian nations that abandoned the gold standard in 1931 recovered from the Great Depression earlier than the gold bloc countries.

== See also ==
- Great Depression
- Gold standard
