= Geneva World Economic Conference (1927) =

International economic conference

The World Economic Conference was an international economic conference held in Geneva in May 1927.

== Overview ==
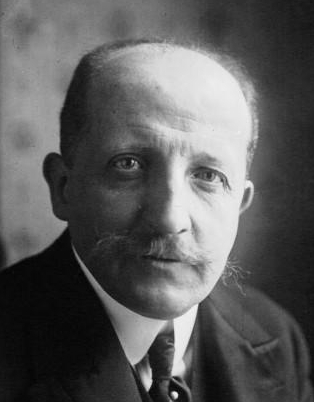
Belgian statesman Georges Theunis (1873–1966) chaired the Geneva Conference.

The conference was held at the Calvinium, from May 4 to 23, 1927, and attended by representatives of 46 member countries of the League of Nations as well as the United States, the Soviet Union, and a few other non-members.

Initially suggested in 1925 by France's Louis Loucheur, it was the first international economic conference formally sponsored by the League, in the wake of the success of the stabilization loans led by its Economic and Financial Organization, particularly in Austria and Hungary, and of the Dawes Plan which had temporarily mitigated the challenge of German war reparations.

Under the chairmanship of former Belgian Prime Minister Georges Theunis, the participants, altogether 194 national delegates and 157 expert advisers, were not formally representing the respective governments; this feature was similar to that adopted at the Brussels Conference (1920), and unlike at the Genoa Conference (1922). The scope was broad both geographically and thematically, as conveyed by the official name "World Economic Conference" mirroring Arthur Salter's preference for an international reach in line with the League's own, against Loucheur's preference for a European focus.

Financial considerations were central to the conference. The delegates unanimously stated that "Financial reconstruction is the basis of economic reconstruction". Efforts to restrain cartels were debated but without success, given the extent of differences between countries.

== See also ==
- International Monetary and Economic Conferences
