= Brussels Monetary Conference (1892) =

International conference

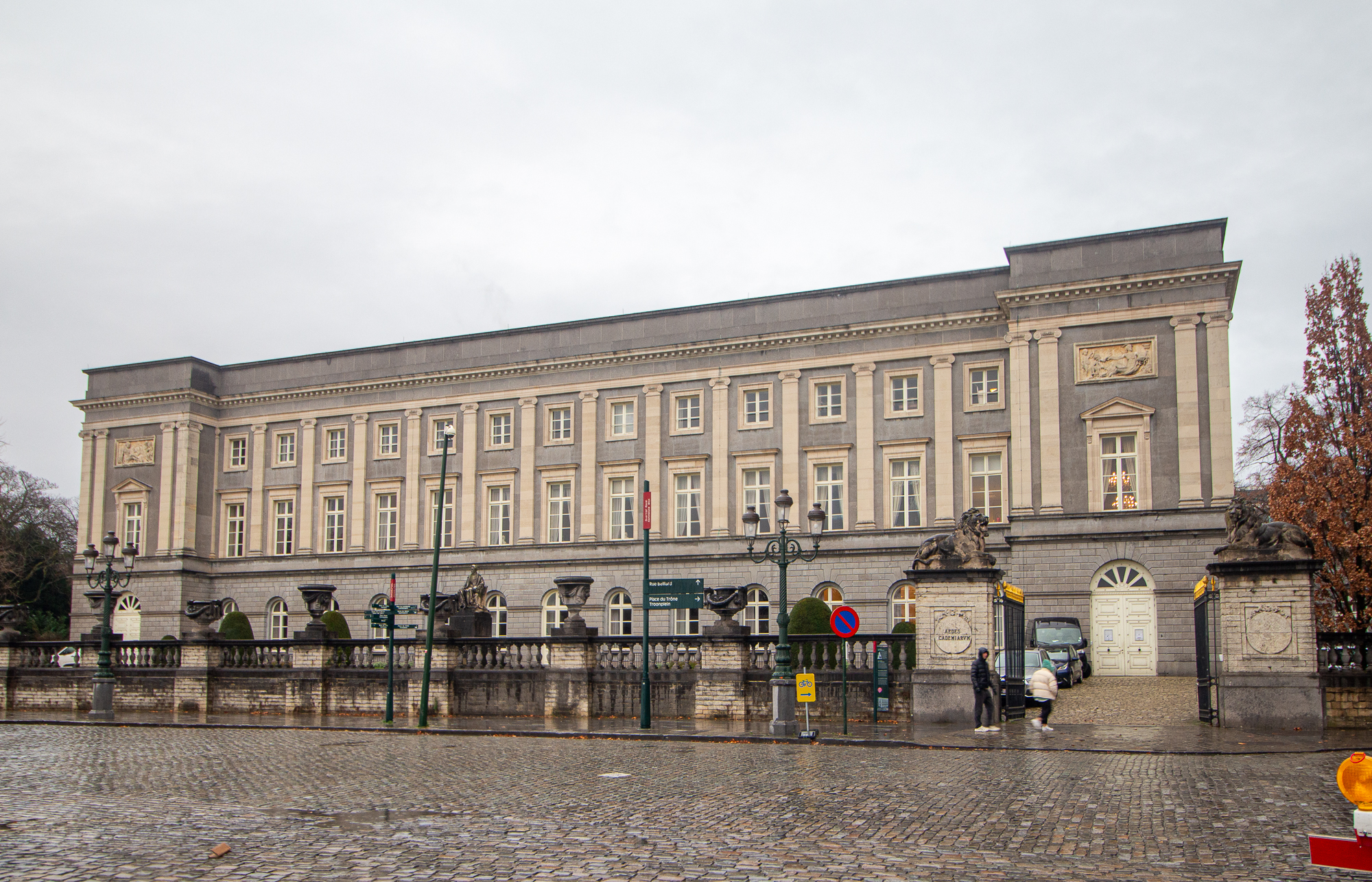
The Academy Palace in Brussels, where the 1892 conference was held

The International Monetary Conference of 1892 was the fourth of a series of international monetary conferences, held in Brussels in November and December 1892. It was chaired by Belgian Senator Georges Montefiore-Levi.

== Overview ==
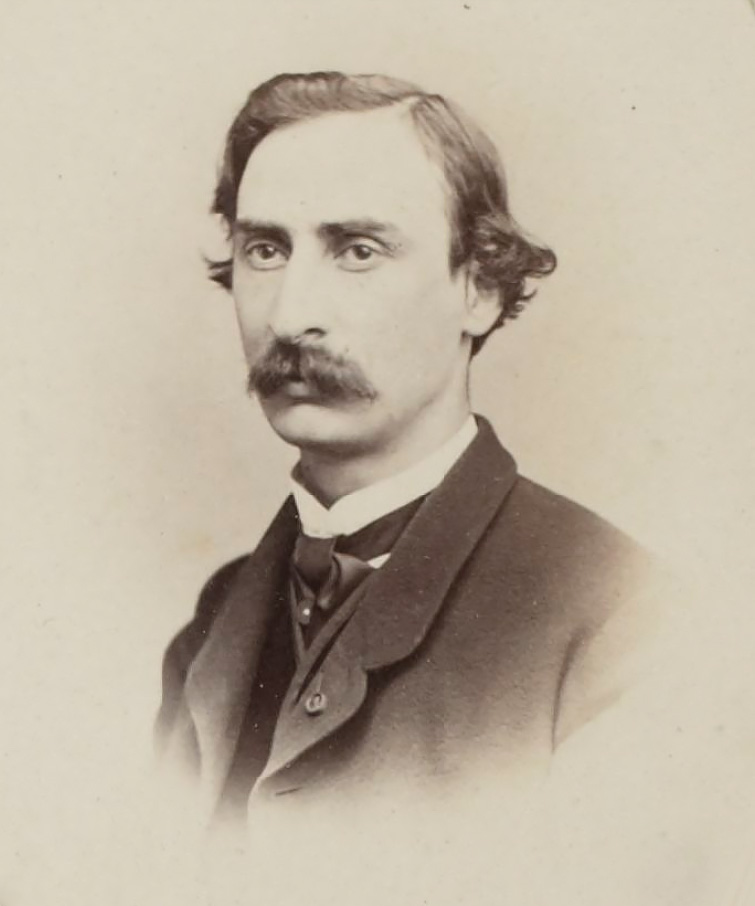
Georges Montefiore-Levi (1832–1906), chairman of the conference

Following the adjournment of the Paris Monetary Conference (1881), concerns kept growing that gold was becoming too scarce while the relative price of silver kept eroding, bringing disturbance to the international monetary system. After several abortive attempts, the fourth and last of the 19th-century International Monetary Conferences was brought together at Brussels in November 1892 on the invitation of U.S. President Benjamin Harrison.

In addition to the United States and Belgium, the participing nations were Austria-Hungary, Denmark, France, Germany, Greece, British India, Italy, Mexico, the Netherlands, Norway, the Ottoman Empire, Portugal, Romania, Russia, Spain, Sweden, Switzerland, and the United Kingdom. Unlike in previous conferences, Norway had a separate delegation from Sweden's, and India had a separate delegation from the UK's. Opening the conference, Belgian Prime Minister Auguste Beernaert referred to the gathering as "the most important conference ever held in Brussels"; it was held in the Marble Hall of the Academy Palace.

Delay arose from the absence of definite proposals by the United States government. These, when they were presented, proved to be only a reaffirmation of the bimetallic policy, with no advance from prior discussions. The U.S. delegates also suggested considerations of reform plans formulated in the recent past by Moritz Levy (at the 1881 conference) and by recently deceased German academic Adolf Soetbeer. At the request of British delegates, the conference also reviewed reforms plans presented by Alfred de Rothschild.

The conference ended in failure, adjourning on 17 December 1892 with a call to meet again on 30 May 1893 that remained eventually unheeded.

At the conference, German academic Julius Wolff submitted a visionary blueprint for an international currency that would be used for emergency lending to national central banks and would be issued by an institution based in a neutral country.

== See also ==
- International Monetary and Economic Conferences
- Brussels Conference (1920)
