= Calvinium =

Building for events in Geneva, Switzerland

Coordinates: 46.20279°N 6.154914°E

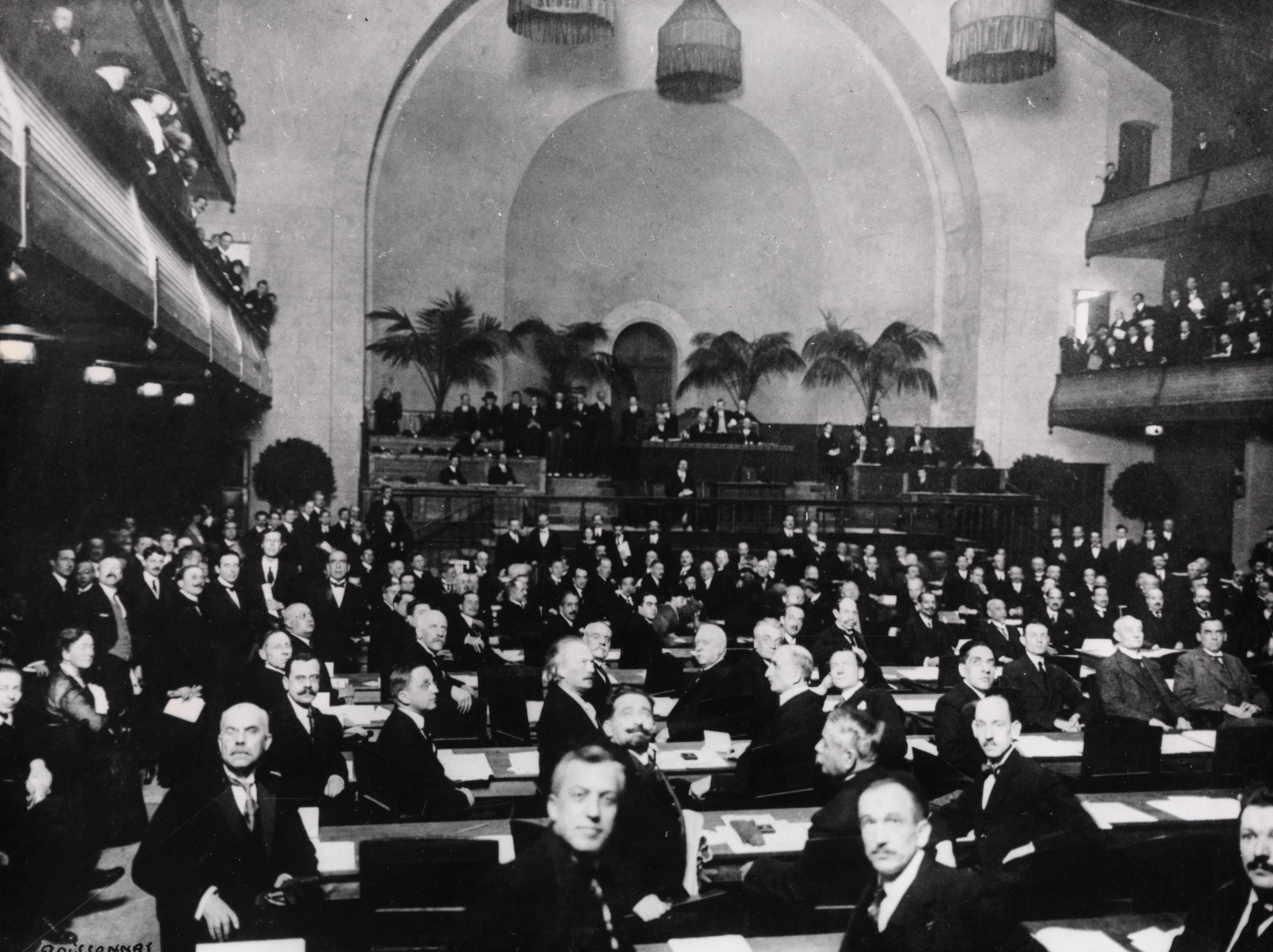
The first meeting of the League of Nations inside the Calvinium

The Calvinium or the Salle de la Réformation was a building for events in Geneva, at the corner of Rue du Rhône and Boulevard Helvétique. It was demolished in 1969 and replaced by a building which now houses the South African consulate. The building, built in honor of John Calvin, was built by Jean-Henri Merle d'Aubigné.

The first meeting of the assembly of the League of Nations took place at the building on 15 November 1920. The Calvinium was also the venue for the World Economic Conference of May 1927.

The Illés Relief was housed in the building for 42 years, being moved out to make way for the League of Nations.
