= Alexander Loveday =

British economist

Alexander Loveday (24.10.1888 St. Andrews: Scotland: United Kingdom – 19 January 1962) was a British economist, who worked for the League of Nations before serving as Warden of Nuffield College, Oxford, from 1950 to 1954.

== Life and career ==
Loveday was born in 1888, and was educated at Shrewsbury School before studying at Peterhouse, Cambridge. After lecturing in political philosophy at Leipzig University from 1911 to 1912, he returned to Cambridge as a lecturer in economics in 1913, but worked for the War Office between 1915 and 1919.

He joined the League of Nations Secretariat in 1919, developed its statistical operations, became Director of the Financial Section of the Economic and Financial Organization's Secretariat in 1931, then Director of the merged Economic, Financial and Transit Department in 1939. In 1940 he led the relocation of the League's economic and financial staff at the Institute for Advanced Study in Princeton, New Jersey, from which he led their work until merger into the newly formed United Nations in April 1946.

He became a Fellow of Nuffield College, Oxford, in 1946, and was appointed Warden in 1950. He was later made an Honorary Fellow of Nuffield, and was also an Honorary Fellow of Peterhouse. He died on 19 January 1962.

His publications included History and Economics of Indian Famines (1914); Britain and World Trade, Quo Vadimus and other essays (1931); The Only Way; A Study of Democracy in Danger (1950); and Reflections on International Administration (1957). Amongst other honours, he was made an honorary member of the Swedish Royal Academy of Science.

In his obituary in The Times, he was described as a "good team leader of a composite international team" whilst at the League of Nations, who was "calm, objective and professional" and who won "universal respect and, in those who knew him best, real affection."
