= Jean-Julien Lemordant =

French painter

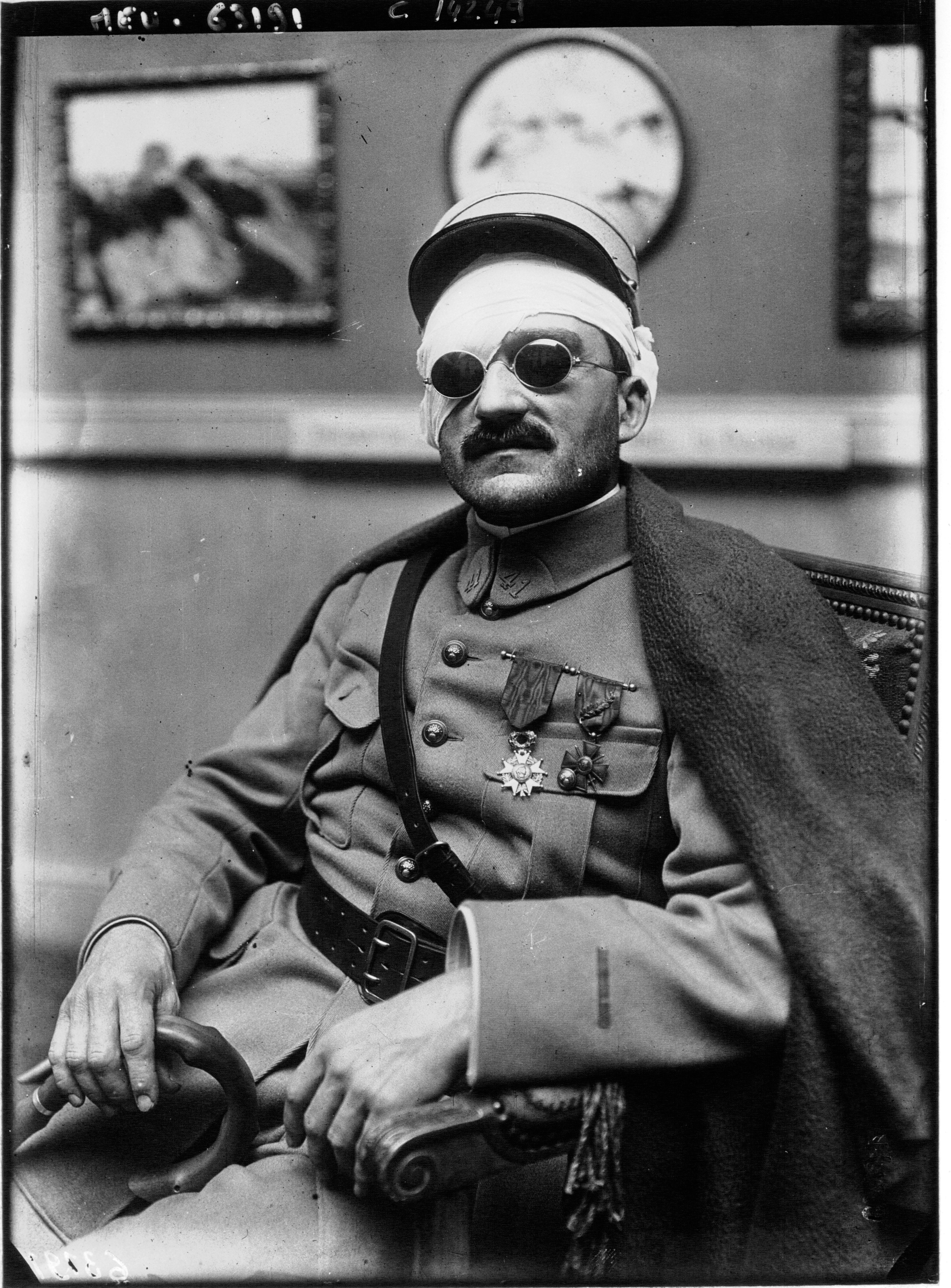
- [1917, after he had lost his eyesight
- Born: Jean-Julien Lemordant; 26 June 1878; St. Malo
- Died: 17 June 1968 (aged 85); Paris
- Known for: Painting
- Movement: Post-Impressionism

Jean-Julien Lemordant (26 June 1878 – 17 June 1968) was a Breton artist and French soldier and patriot.

== Life ==
Lemordant was born in St. Malo. He grew up in Brittany and was orphaned in his teens. At first he studied architecture but made his career as a painter, initially in Rennes and later in Paris, studying under Léon Bonnat at the Beaux-Arts.

The life of Brittany figured prominently in his early paintings, including his paintings for the Hôtel de l'Épée dining rooms at Quimper, and for the ceiling of the Theatre of Rennes. He was associated with Charles Cottet, and his influences included Gauguin, the Fauves, and the School of Pont-Aven. When his work was exhibited in Paris, it was to broad critical acclaim.

== Blindness ==
At the outset of World War I, in August 1914, he volunteered for France and was sent to the front as a private. He was wounded at Charleroi and promoted to lieutenant. In October 1915 he was again wounded, at the battle of Artois, and further wounds in the same battle left him blind. He was left for four days, thought dead, then was taken as prisoner to Germany. He was eventually exchanged and returned to France through Switzerland.

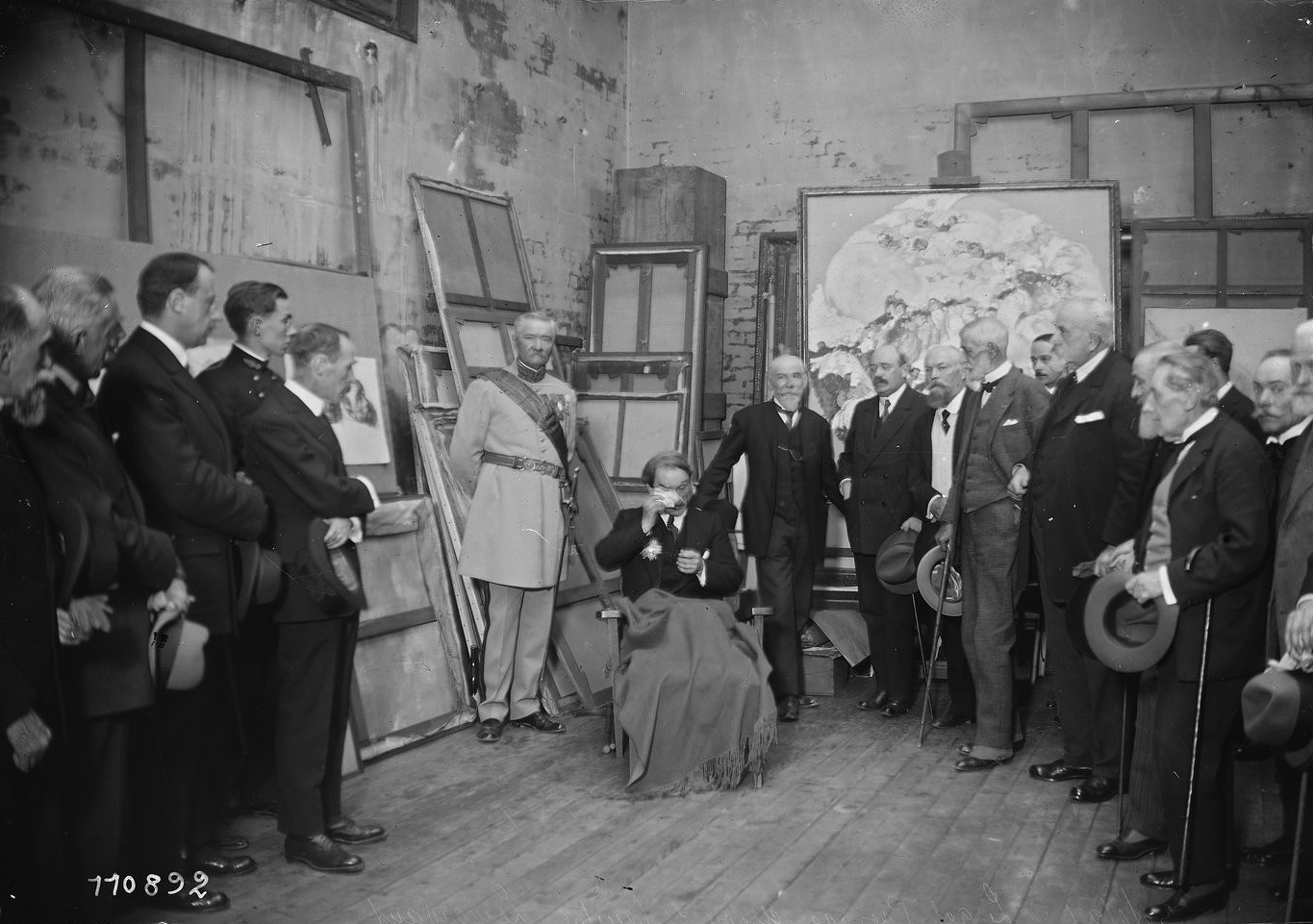
Jean-Julien Lemordant being awarded by General Passaga on June 30, 1926

Embraced as a victim of German "Kultur", Lemordant became an inspirational speaker, talking about the effects of his blindness, and the role of the artist in society. He believed that France was victorious over Germany because a series of great artists (Carrière, Sisley, Pissarro, Puvis de Chavannes and Rodin) had kept the spirit of art and sacrifice alive in France. In 1919 he was awarded the Howland Memorial Prize and his works were exhibited at Yale University; the retrospective exhibit also was shown at the Gimple and Wildenstein Galleries in New York, and toured the United States under the auspices of the American Federation of Art. In 1926, he was made a Commandeur of the Légion d'Honneur, and was carried through the Grand Palais on the shoulders of the greatest artist of the day.

Lemordant was made Professor of Esthetics at the École des Beaux-Arts, for life.

In 1927, he acquired a site on the Avenue-René-Coty, and designed, with the assistance of Jean Launay, the Hôtel Lemordant to be erected there. His living quarters contained a huge, naturally lit studio, which, being blind, he never used.

== Later years ==
Fifty years after his injuries, a series of operations restored his sight.

Lemordant died unmarried of tear-gas poisoning during the May 1968 student uprisings in Paris.
