= Howland Memorial Prize =

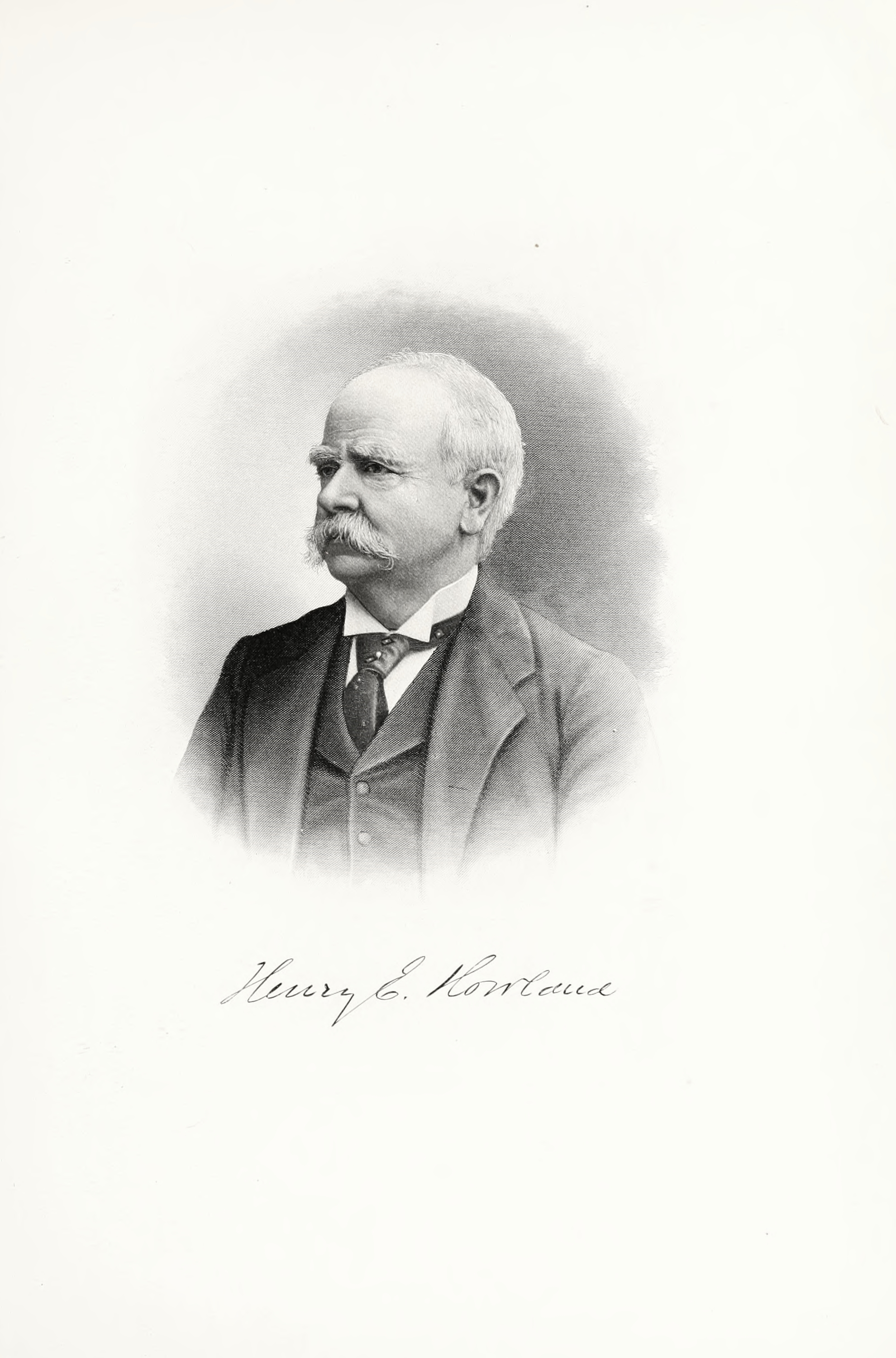
Henry Elias Howland

The Henry Howland Memorial Prize at Yale was created in 1915 for a "citizen of any country in recognition of some achievement of marked distinction in the field of literature or fine arts or the science of government." The idealistic quality of the recipient's work is an important factor in his selection.

The award was established in honor of Henry Elias Howland (1835–1913), a member of the Yale class of 1854, by a donation of $15,000 by his children Charles P. Howland (Yale 1891), Dr. John Howland (Yale 1894), and Frances Howland.

== Recipients ==
The prize has generally been awarded every two years; the following is a partial list of recipients:

- 1916 - Rupert Brooke (1887–1915), soldier and poet (awarded posthumously)
- 1918 - Jean-Julien Lemordant (1882–1968), artist
- 1924 - Gustav Holst (1874–1934), composer
- 1925 - Robert Edmond Jones (1887–1954), scenic designer
- 1929 - Arthur Salter (1881–1975), diplomat involved in the League of Nations
- 1930 - Ragnar Ostberg (1866–1945), architect
- 1933 - Philip John Noel-Baker (1889–1982), politician and diplomat who later won the Nobel Peace Prize
- 1937 - Salvador de Madariaga (1886–1978), diplomat and historian
- 1939 - John Bell Condliffe (1891–1981), economist
- 1940 - Paul Hindemith (1895–1963), composer
- 1943 - Joseph C. Grew (1880–1965), diplomat
- 1944 - Field Marshal Sir John Dill (1881–1944), British representative on the Combined Chiefs of Staff
- 1949 - Sven Markelius (1889–1972), architect
- 1952 - John Hersey (1914–1993), author
- 1954 - Ralph Vaughan Williams (1872–1958), composer
- 1955 - Sir Owen Dixon (1886–1972), judge and diplomat
- 1958 - Sir Hector Hetherington (1888–1965), Principal of the University of Glasgow
- 1966 - Tyrone Guthrie (1900–1971), theatre director
- 1967 - Indira Gandhi (1917–1984), Prime Minister of India
- 1970 - Aaron Copland (1900–1990), composer
- 1971 - Leopold Stokowski (1882–1977), conductor
- 1977 - Alistair Cooke (1908–2004), journalist and broadcaster
- 1980 - Warren J. Haas (1924–2016), president of the Association of Research Libraries
- 1989 - Russell Baker (1925–2019), author
- 2008 - Tony Blair (b. 1953), Prime Minister of the United Kingdom
- 2010 - Paul Krugman (b. 1953), economist

There are other Howland Fellowships and Prizes, including the Charles P. Howland Fellowship, at Yale, established in 1947 by Frances L. Howland as a tribute to her brother Charles P. Howland, Class of 1891, and the American Pediatric Society's John Howland Medal honoring another brother, Dr. John Howland, professor of pediatrics at Johns Hopkins Medical School.

== See also ==
- List of awards for contributions to culture
