= Paris Monetary Conference (1878) =

International economic conference

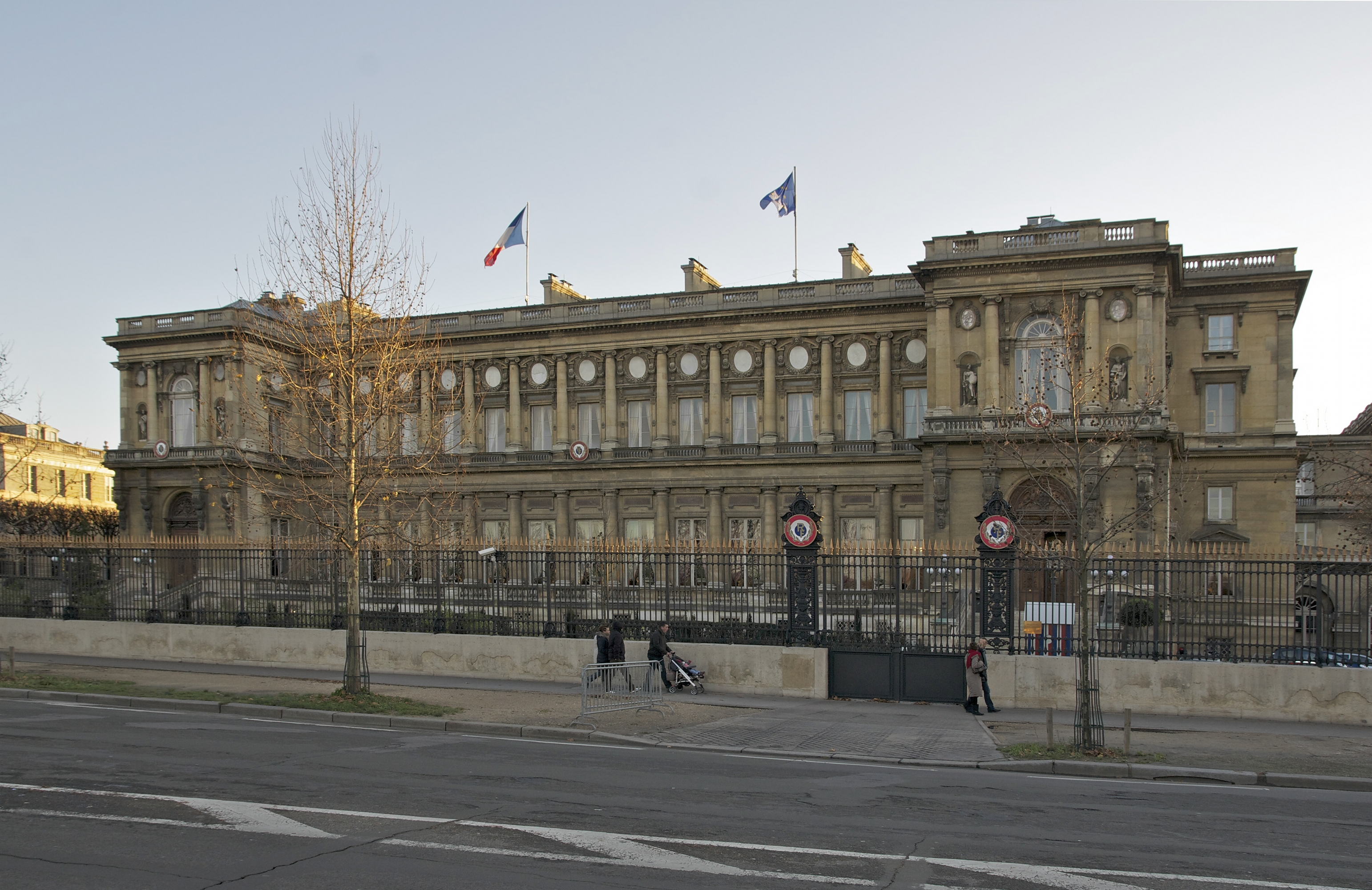
The conference was held in the building of the Ministry of Foreign Affairs on Quai d'Orsay, Paris

The International Monetary Conference was the second of a series of international monetary conferences, held at the Ministry of Foreign Affairs on Quai d'Orsay, Paris, from 10 to 29 August 1878. It was chaired by French finance minister Léon Say.

== Overview ==
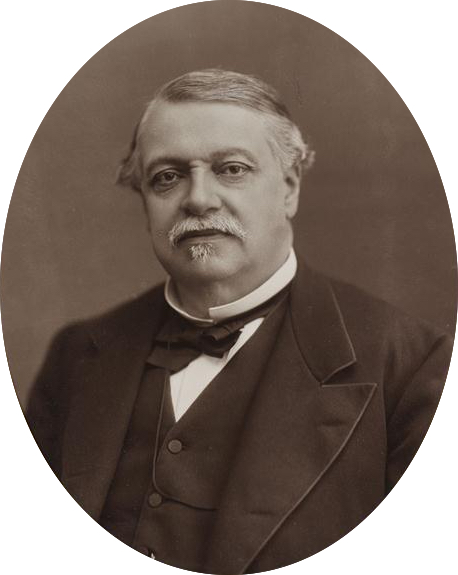
Léon Say (1826-1896), French Finance Minister at the time of the conference

A great fall in the relative price of silver as measured in gold, in progress since 1873, had affected the relations of silver-using countries, and disturbed the level of prices. Producers of silver in the United States suffered, while the management of all double-standard currencies became a task of increasing difficulty.

In 1878, the U.S. Bland–Allison Act called for an international conference to address the problem. The conference was assembled in Paris for the sake of convenience, in contrast to 1867 when the impulse came from the French authorities. It brought together Austria-Hungary, Belgium, France, Italy, the Netherlands, Russia, Sweden (jointly with Norway), Switzerland, the United Kingdom as well as the United States, though not Germany. The conference agenda was to consider: first the desirability of retaining the unrestricted use of silver for coinage, and second the adoption of international bimetallism, by the acceptance of a ratio to be fixed by agreement.

After somewhat protracted discussion and the presentation of a large number of documents, the European states accepted the United States' proposition "that it is necessary to maintain in the world the monetary functions of silver," but declined to bind the discretion of particular states as to the methods to be employed. They further declared it impossible to enter into an agreement for a common ratio. The conference, therefore, separated without any result being obtained.

== See also ==
- Paris Monetary Conference (1867)
- International Monetary and Economic Conferences
