= John B. Condliffe =

Economist

John Bell Condliffe KCMG
- Born: 23 December 1891; Footscray, Victoria, Australia
- Died: 23 December 1981 (aged 90); Walnut Creek, California, United States

John Bell Condliffe KCMG (Footscray, Victoria, 23 December 1891 – Walnut Creek, California, 23 December 1981) was a New Zealand economist, university professor and economic consultant. Lauded for the decisive role he played in international NGOs in the interwar period, he was one of New Zealand's best-known international economists.

== Career ==
A professor of economics at the Canterbury University College, Condliffe resigned in 1926 to become the first research secretary of the Institute of Pacific Relations, a nascent international organization concerned with the Pacific basin. He took a 2/3 part-time position at the University of Michigan during the academic year 1930–1931, then left the IPR altogether to enter the Economic and Financial Organization of the League of Nations, where he wrote the six first World Economic Surveys (1932–1937).

Having left the League to become professor of commerce at the London School of Economics in 1938–1939, Condliffe was distinguished in 1939 by the prestigious Howland Memorial Prize and accepted a professorship in economics at the University of California, Berkeley, which he held until retirement in 1953. In the meantime, he returned to the IPR as the chairman of its International Research Committee between 1940 and 1945.

== Honours ==
- 1939: Howland Memorial Prize
- 1977: KCMG (honorary)

== Books ==
- John B. Condliffe (ed. and preface William L. Holland), Reminiscences of the Institute of Pacific Relations, Vancouver, Institute of Asian Research (University of British Columbia), 1981.
- J.B. Condliffe, The Commerce of Nations, 1950.
