= Cannes Conference (1922) =

1922 conclave of nations held in France

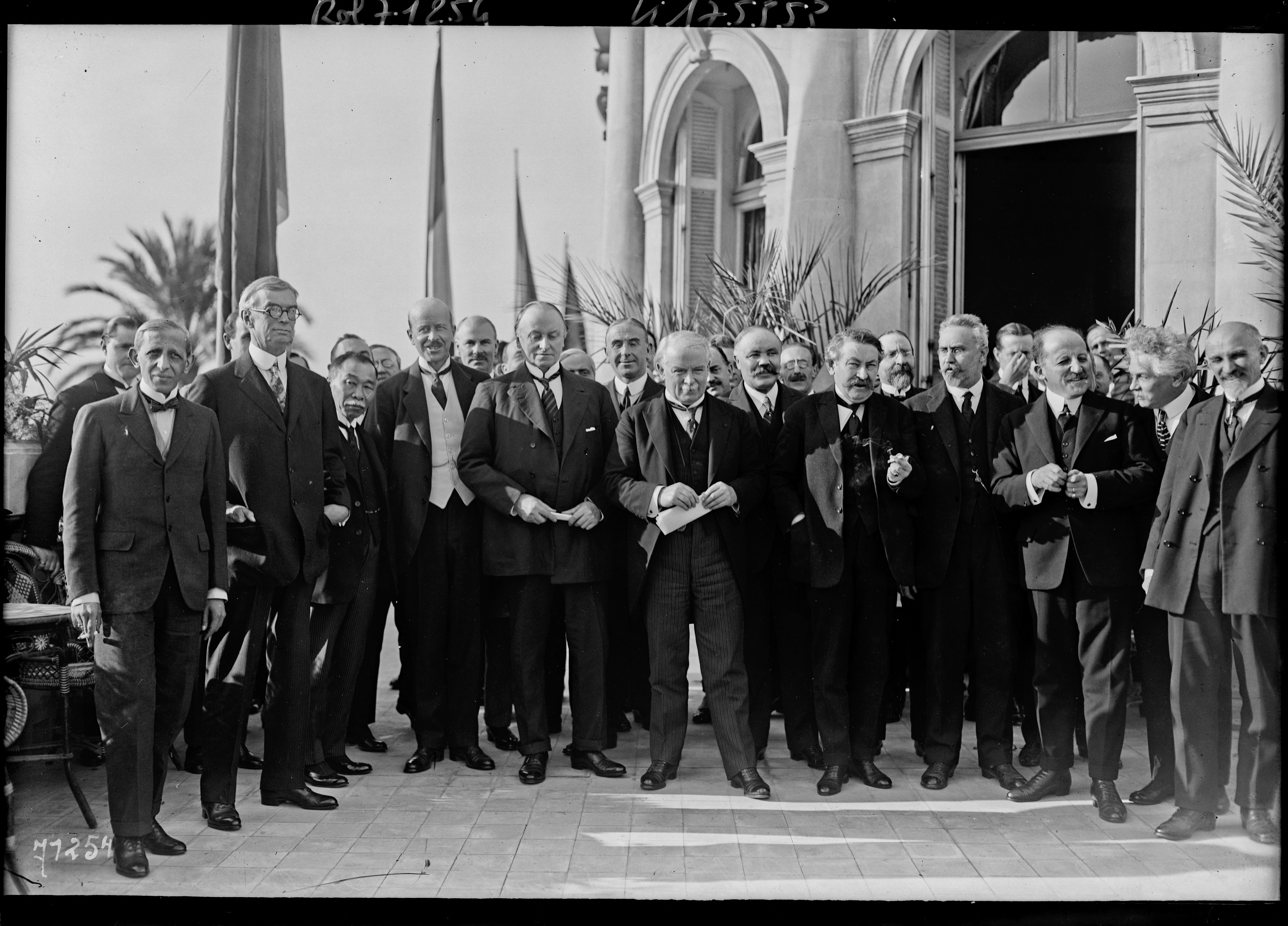
- Delegates to the Cannes Conference (front row, from left to right): Tomasi, Harvey, Hayashi, Worthington-Evans, Curzon, Lloyd George, Briand, Bonomi, Theunis, Jaspar
- Host country: France
- Date: 6–13 January 1922
- Cities: Cannes
- Participants: France; Italy; United Kingdom; Belgium; Japan
- Precedes: Genoa Conference (1922)

The Cannes Conference was a formal conclave of nations held in Cannes, France, from 6 January to 13 January 1922. It brought together the Allied nations of the First World War.

The Cannes Conference primarily revolved around discussions between French Prime Minister Aristide Briand and British Prime Minister David Lloyd George regarding war reparations by Germany under the Treaty of Versailles. Briand's departure on 12 January, and the collapse of his government the next day resulted in the ending of the conference.
