= Brussels Conference on Syria and the Region =

Diplomatic conference on Syria

The Brussels Conference on Supporting the Future of Syria and the Region is a high-level pledging conference that has been held annually since 2017. The conference is organised by the European External Action Service (EEAS), the diplomatic service and combined foreign and defense ministry of the European Union (EU). In previous years, the United Nations has also acted as a co-host. The primary objective of the Brussels Conferences is to continue supporting the Syrian people and to mobilise the international community in support of a comprehensive and credible political solution to the Syrian civil war, in line with UN Security Council Resolution 2254. The conference is the main pledging event for Syria to take place on a regular basis.

== Meetings ==
In 2018, the Brussels III conference raised €3.5 billion ($4 billion).

In 2021 the conference was held virtually on 29 and 30 March. It was the main pledging event for Syria and the region that year, raising €5.3 billion in funding.

In 2022 the conference, titled Brussels VI, was held on 9 and 10 May and raised €6.4 billion in funding.
