= Genoa Economic and Financial Conference (1922) =

International economic conference

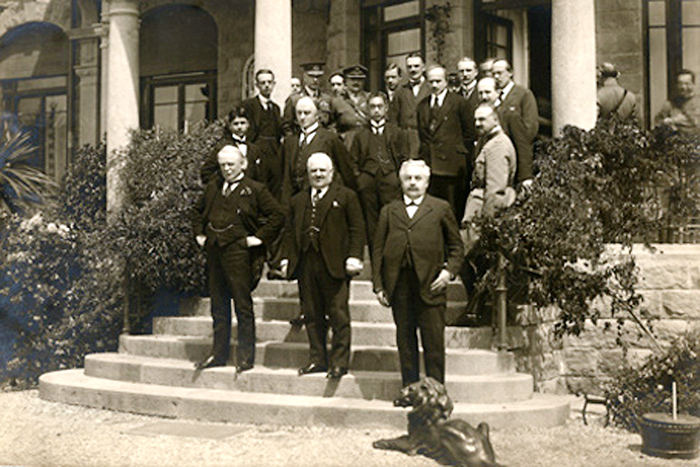
Participants at the 1922 Genoa Conference.

The Economic and Financial Conference was a formal conclave of representatives from 34 European countries held in the ancient Palazzo San Giorgio of Genoa, Italy, from 10 April to 19 May 1922.

Unlike the previous international economic conference in Brussels (1920), the Genoa conference was attended by heads of government and not only experts, which enhanced its authority but also the risks of politicization and grandstanding, at a time of contention on the unresolved issue of German war reparations.

The conference was intended by the British Prime Minister David Lloyd George to resolve the major economic and political issues facing Europe and to address the pariah status of Germany and the Soviet Union, both of which had been excluded from the Paris Peace Conference of 1919. The conference was particularly intended to develop a strategy to rebuild a defeated Germany, as well as the states of both Central Europe and Eastern Europe, and to negotiate a relationship between European capitalist economies and the Bolshevik regime in Moscow. Germany and the Soviet Union predictably expressed loud dissent and stole the limelight by negotiating a separate bilateral agreement on the conference's sidelines, the Treaty of Rapallo.

Even so, the conference further cemented the policy consensus on principles formed at the Brussels gathering two years before. The Economic and Financial Organization of the League of Nations (EFO) presented a report to the conference, which provided the first official articulation of the gold exchange standard, and also tackled novel fields for international financial cooperation such as capital flight, tax evasion, and double taxation. The conference also found agreement on the principle that financial stability must come first before trade restrictions could be beneficially lifted, even though no convergence was achieved on trade liberalization measures as the EFO had recommended.

== Background ==
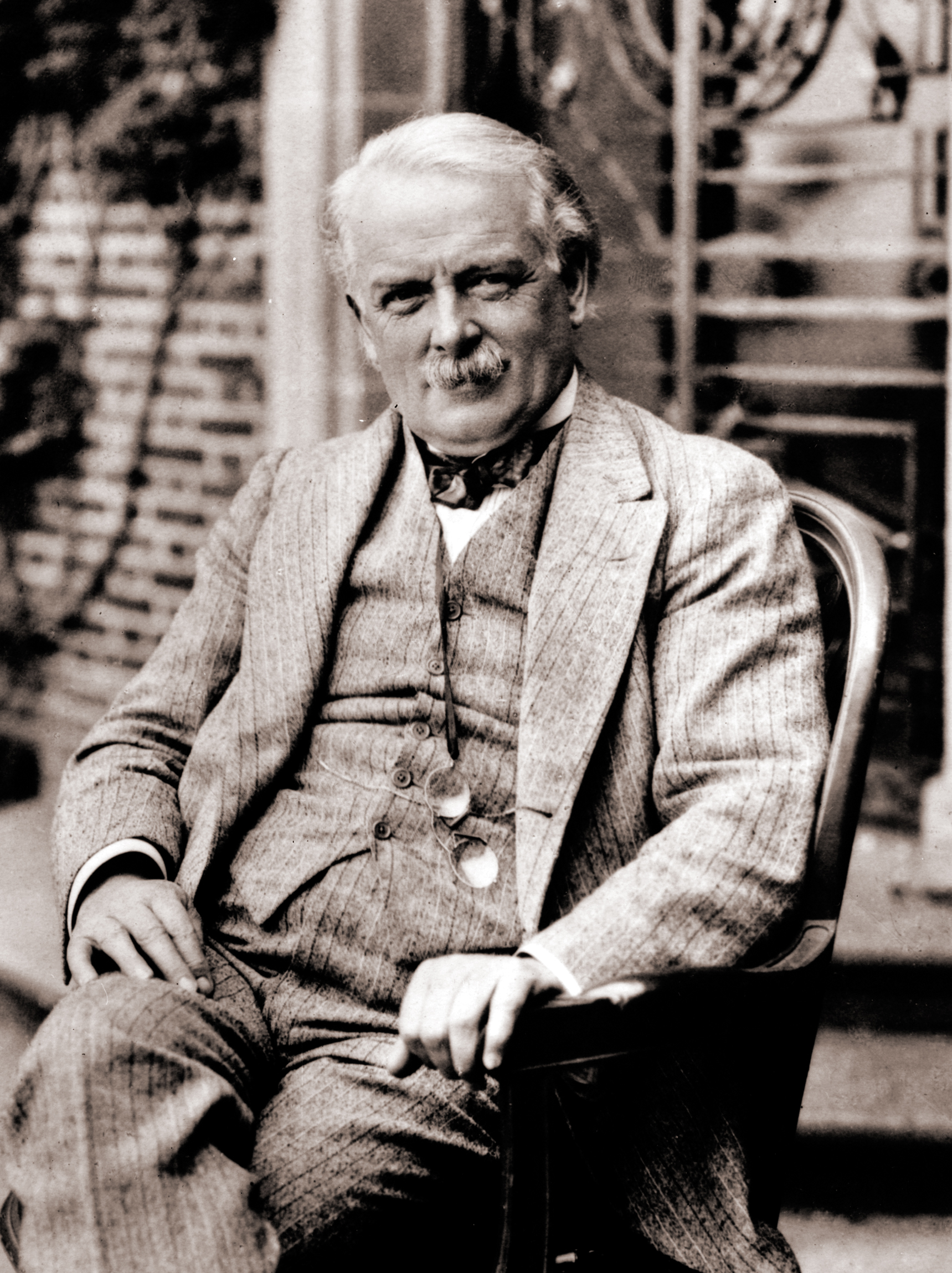
British Prime Minister David Lloyd George (1863–1945) designed the 1922 conference in Genoa, Italy.

The idea for a general economic and financial conference of European nations had roots in a January 1922 session of the Supreme War Council, held in Cannes. With Europe facing an economic catastrophe brought about by the half-decade First World War, marked by millions of deaths, shattered infrastructure and vast sums of squandered economic resources, British Prime Minister David Lloyd George sought an authoritative international gathering to set Europe's political and financial house in order and to establish his leadership firmly at home.

The formal proposal was made at Cannes on 6 January 1922 in the form of a draft resolution calling for such a conference that was presented by Lloyd George and was approved unanimously the same date.

Lloyd George told the British Parliament that the primary intent of the conference was to provide for the "reconstruction of economic Europe, devastated and broken into fragments by the desolating agency of war". The economy of Europe was at the point of collapse, as Lloyd George noted:

If European countries had gathered together their mobile wealth accumulated by centuries of industry and thrift on to one pyramid and then set fire to it, the result could hardly have been more complete. International trade has been disorganized through and through. The recognized medium of commerce, exchange based upon currency, has become almost worthless and unworkable; vast areas, upon which Europe has hitherto depended for a large proportion of its food supplies and its raw material, completely destroyed for all purposes of commerce; nations, instead of cooperating to restore, broken up by suspicions and creating difficulties and new artificial restrictions; great armies ready to march, and nations already overburdened with taxation having to bear the additional taxation which the maintenance of these huge armaments to avoid suspected dangers renders necessary.

Lloyd George controversially sought the inclusion of Germany and Soviet Russia to the international conference as equal members, which was met by particular opposition of France, which sought to neutralise and to isolate the two pariah nations of Europe by including them only in an inferior capacity. Any softening in the hardline stance towards Germany was perceived by France as a weakening of the Treaty of Versailles of which France was a prime beneficiary and to which it was immutably committed.

== Reparations and recognition ==
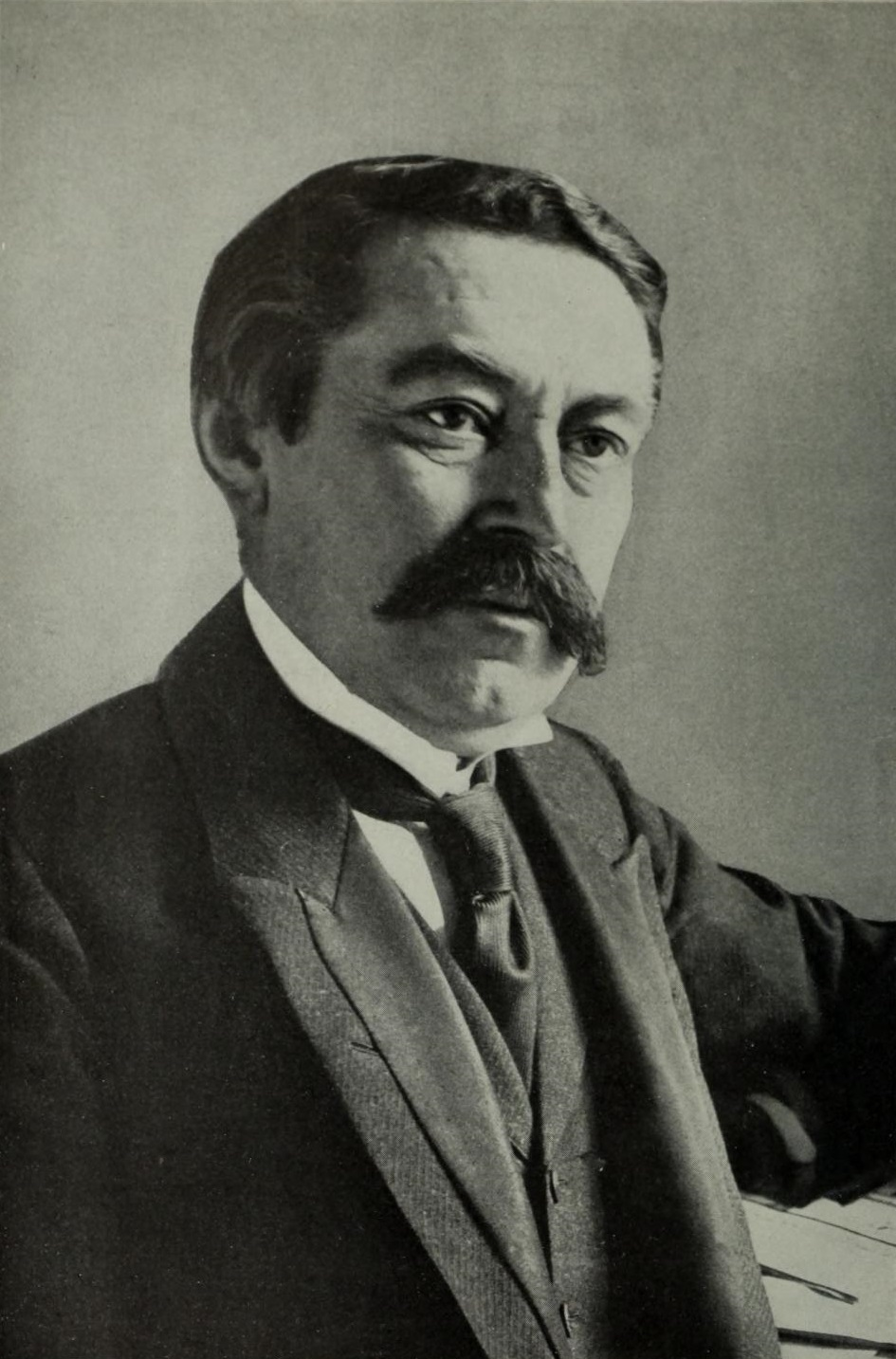
French Prime Minister Aristide Briand (1862–1932), whose government fell shortly before the convocation of the Genoa Conference.

Two great issues lay as impediments to convocation of a multilateral convention to plan the economic reconstruction of Europe. One was the issue of reparations, which was regarded as the primary matter of contention between the Triple Entente powers of France and Britain in the postwar era. At issue was whether the terms of economic reparations in the Treaty of Versailles, which ended the war, were to be enforced or amended. The British thought that massive reconstruction costs laid upon Germany would undermine European economic recovery and the market for British exports of manufactured goods. The French believed that if Germany was allowed to skirt the severe financial obligations detailed in the peace treaty, its economic rise would be massively accelerated, and its political and military hegemony on the continent would be rapidly restored.

France, among the main battlegrounds of the European conflagration, was particularly hard-hit and in need of external funds for reconstruction. Germany was seen as having largely escaped the destruction of infrastructure and economic capacity during the war and currently engaged in the systematic underestimation of its ability to pay. The political and economic weakness of Germany was emphasized by its new Weimar government, which effectively made the argument that it would be unable to maintain the specified payment schedule.

Germany's position came to be regarded as reasonably correct by British, American and other policymakers despite quiet indications from even some German authorities that some substantial portion of the reparations bill could be safely managed. German politicians sought to minimise their country's tax burden by the acquisition of foreign loans and the reduction of the overall reparations bill. British, American and Swiss bankers were adamant that necessary loans would not be available until a final achievable reparations bill and repayment schedule could be agreed upon by all of the main parties in the dispute.

In the meantime, German authorities attempted to raise the foreign currency necessary for reparations by dumping paper currency unbacked by gold on the market. That triggered a hyperinflation paralyzing the country's economy, which had a desired subsidiary effect of helping to make the case that the current schedule of reparations was untenable. It was hoped by Germany, the United Kingdom and the United States and feared by France that the Genoa Conference would provide an opportunity for downward revision of the reparations schedule that had been set forth by the treaty.

The apparent softening of the economic terms of the peace, which had taken place at Cannes, had led to the toppling of the government of the French Prime Minister Aristide Briand and threatened the conference by leaving his successor, Raymond Poincaré, with little appetite for participation. It was only through a dedicated diplomatic offensive by Lloyd George towards the French government in February 1922 that its participation at the April conference was won, under terms that had been agreed to by the Briand government. Although antagonism between France and Britain had festered in the months immediately after the war, France found itself in the uncomfortable position of having to submit to British desires on the matter of an economic conference since without British support, France would have had little chance of collecting reparations from Germany or joining any potential strategic military alliance.

The second potential hurdle to holding the Genoa Conference surrounded participation of the new Bolshevik government of Russia, as the United States and most of Europe did not maintain formal diplomatic relations with the regime and harboured economic claims against it. That inconvenient situation had been effectively set aside by the Supreme Council itself, which approved a formal resolution at its meeting of 10 January 1922 that invited Soviet participation and called upon the Bolsheviks to submit a list of delegates and support staff seeking to attend so that safe-conduct passes for travel and accommodation could be arranged.

== Opening ==
Interior view of the main hall of the Palazzo di San Giorgio, location of plenary meetings of the Genoa Conference of 1922.

The opening ceremony of the Genoa Conference took place at 3 pm on 10 April 1922 at the Palazzo di San Giorgio, one of the oldest palaces in the city. Delegations entered at one end of the palace and ran a gauntlet of news photographers from around the world. At the opposite end, guests, journalists and members of the delegations' support staffs disembarked from a column of automobiles to go inside the building. Admission to journalists was through tickets distributed ahead of the event, which were strictly limited.

The entrance of Lloyd George was met with a great ovation from those assembled in the hall as he took his seat to the left of the chairman's seat at the front of the room. As the chief architect of the gathering, he effectively dominated the conference's public sessions.

Canada, attending within the British Empire delegation, was represented by the Montreal industrialist Sir Charles Gordon and the economist Édouard Montpetit, whose joint report on the conference was tabled in the Canadian Parliament the following year.

== Return to gold standard ==
Among the propositions formulated at the conference was the proposal that central banks make a partial return to the gold standard, which had been dropped to print money to pay for the war. Central banks wanted a return to a gold-based economy to ease international trade and facilitating economic stability, but they wanted a gold standard that "conserved" gold stocks, with the gold remaining in the vaults and day-to-day transactions being conducted with representative paper notes.

The partial return to the gold standard was accomplished by permitting central banks to keep part of their reserves in currencies, which were themselves directly exchangeable for gold coins. However, citizens would not receive gold coins of the realm in exchange for their notes, unlike the prewar gold standard.

Citizens of European countries had to redeem their banknotes in large gold bars, which were unsuitable for day-to-day transactions and largely achieved the goal of keeping the gold in the vaults.

== Treaty of Rapallo ==
On 16 April 1922 on the sidelines of the Genoa Conference, Russia and Germany signed the Treaty of Rapallo. Ratifications were exchanged in Berlin on 31 January 1923. The treaty did not include secret military provisions, but secret military co-operation soon followed.

== Conclusion and assessment ==
With the Treaty of Rapallo pulling Russia and Germany out of the main picture, the conference lapsed into a stalemate. The major powers at first agreed on a contingency package of financial aid to Russia, but the Allies could not agree on the final plan and so nothing was offered. The issue of German reparations went nowhere after Poincaré threatened to invade Germany unilaterally if Berlin defaulted on its next round of payments. Lloyd George was increasingly undercut by heavy attacks from the London newspapers but offered a final series of linked proposals, which would reduce Germany's liabilities for reparations, increase the French share of payments and float an international loan to finance German payments, with the money from the loan going directly to France. However, nothing was approved, Germany was expelled, France and Belgium withdrew and the final draft communiqué to Russia was signed only by Britain, Italy, Japan, Poland, Romania, Switzerland, and Sweden and left out the key world powers except Britain itself. Russia, in turn, rejected this final document. The last decision was to set up another conference at The Hague to take up the same issues.

The British historian Kenneth O. Morgan concluded:

Genoa was a watershed in international diplomacy.... Never again would such a large, rambling assembly, on the lines of Paris in 1919, be convened, until San Francisco in 1945.... There was too little detailed preparation, too much generalized optimism, too many disparate issues muddled up with one another. In many ways, it was a parody of summit diplomacy at its worst.

Despite its ending in failure, the Genoa Conference has been assessed as having a lasting intellectual impact. It cemented a consensus on the need for a stable value of money to support Europe's economic reconstruction, building on the prior debates at the Brussels conference of 1920, accepting austerity. Its resolutions represent the first official endorsement of the need for international cooperation among central banks, paving the way for the creation several years later of the Bank for International Settlements.

== See also ==
- International Monetary and Economic Conferences

== Sources ==
- Jane Degras (ed.), Soviet Documents on Foreign Policy. London: Oxford University Press, 1951.
- David Lloyd George, "The Genoa Conference and Britain's Part," Advocate of Peace through Justice, vol. 84, no. 4 (April 1922), pp. 131–137. In JSTOR —Speech to Commons of 3 April 1922.
