= Paris Monetary Conference (1867) =

International economic conference

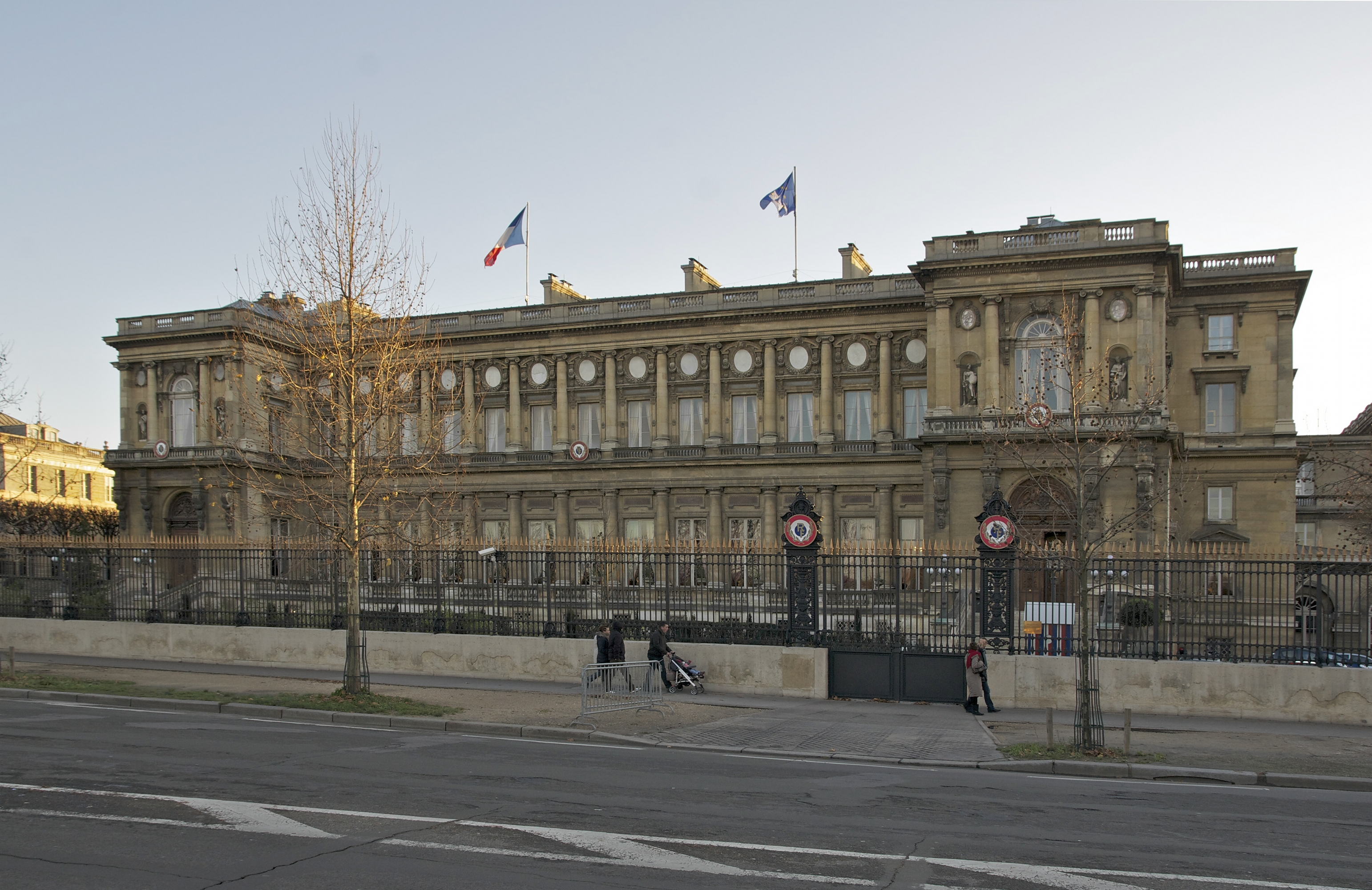
The conference was held in the recently completed prestige building of the Ministry of Foreign Affairs on Quai d'Orsay, Paris

The International Monetary Conference was held in Paris from 17 June to 6 July 1867, the first of a series of international monetary conferences.

The conference was the brainchild of French statesman Félix Esquirou de Parieu, who had been instrumental in the creation two years before of the Latin Monetary Union.

== Overview ==
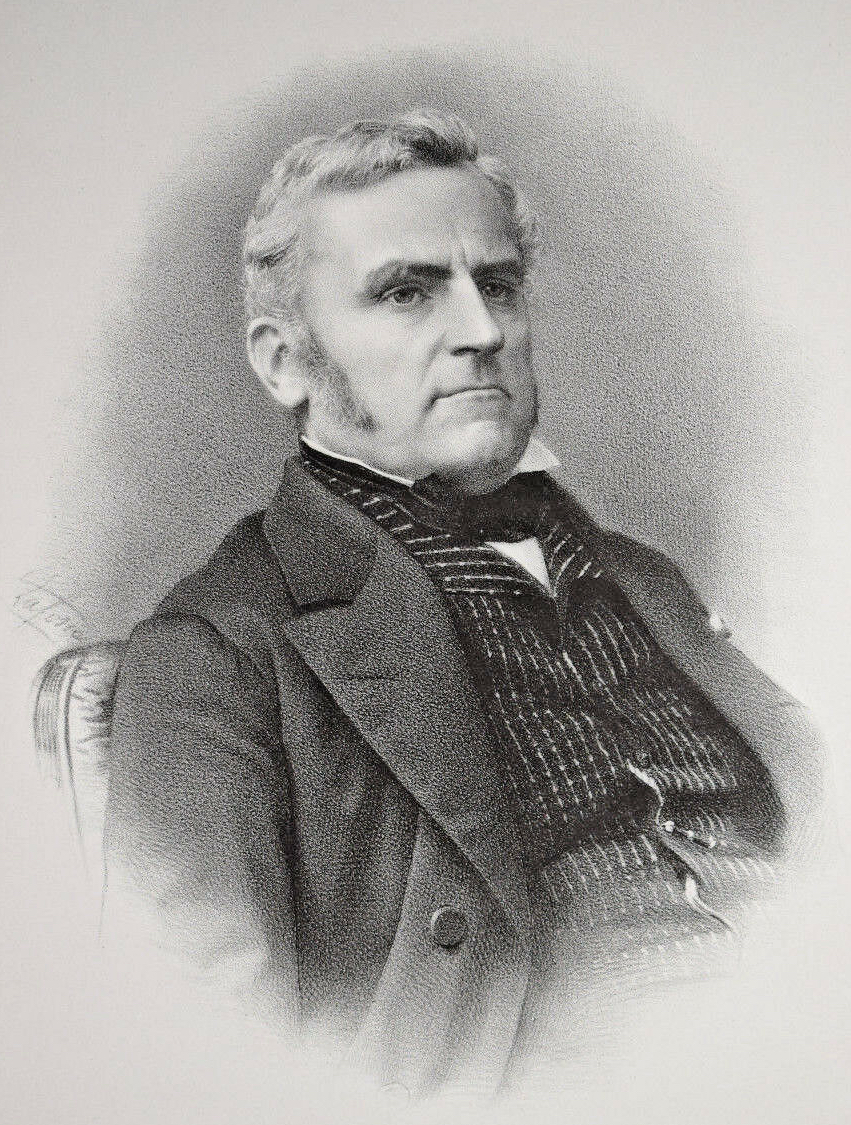
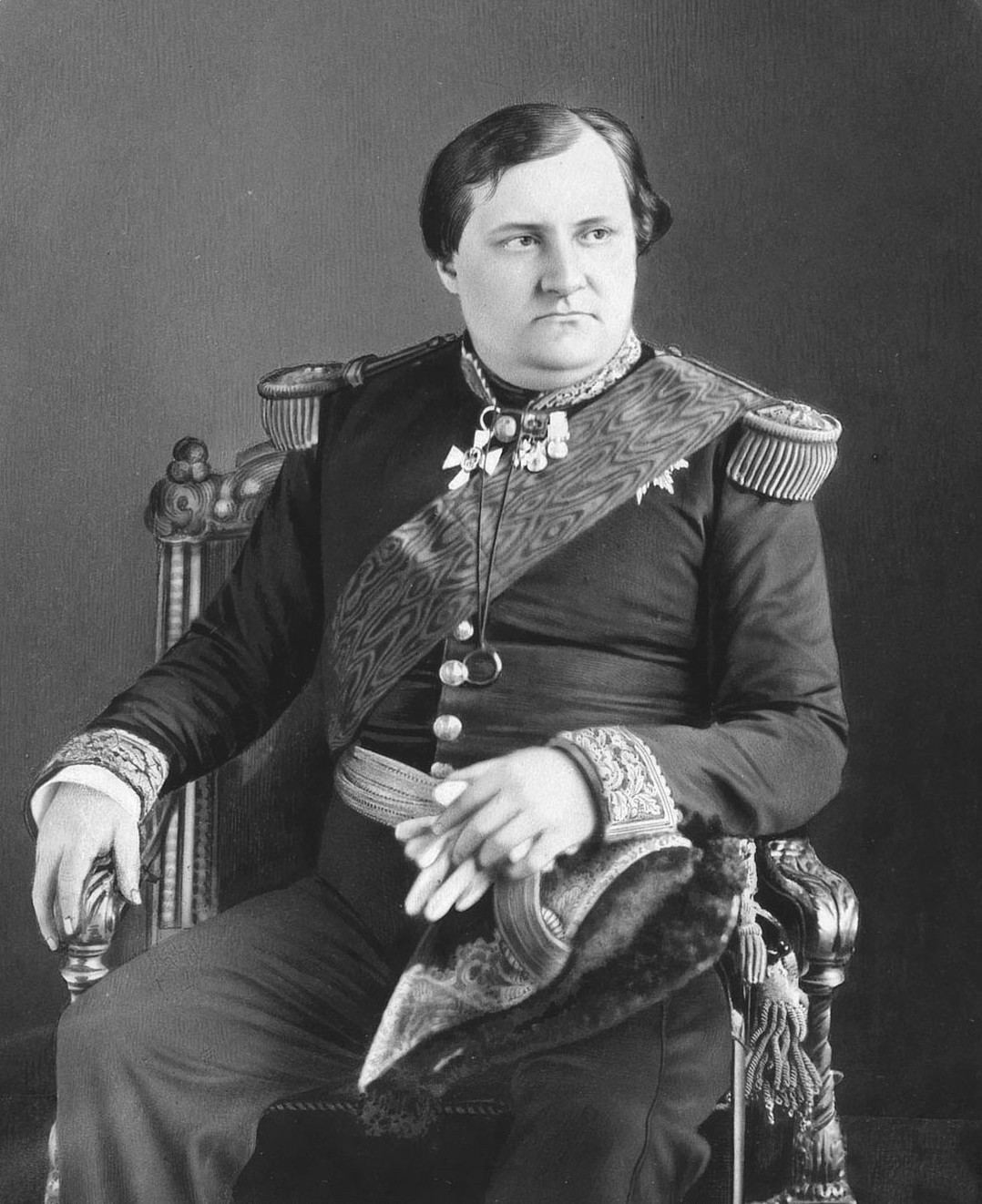
Félix Esquirou de Parieu (left) and Prince Napoleon-Jérôme Bonaparte (right) chaired the conference's sessions

The Paris Exhibition of 1867 furnished the occasion for summoning the conference, which was attended by Austria, Baden, Bavaria, Belgium, Denmark, Greece, France, Italy, the Netherlands, the Ottoman Empire, Portugal, Prussia, Russia, Spain, Sweden (jointly with Norway), Switzerland, the United Kingdom, the United States, and Württemberg. The inaugural session was chaired by French foreign minister Lionel de Moustier, then the next three by Parieu. As the conference was viewed as having had a successful start, Napoleon III, as a sign of imperial approbation, designated Prince Napoléon-Jérôme Bonaparte to take the chair; the prince chaired the last four sessions.

By Parieu's advice, a scheme was approved recommending the adoption of the single gold standard, decimalisation of currencies, and the coordination of the various currencies with the French currency system.

Difficulties as to the mode of bringing these principles into practical operation were discussed, and full liberty had to be given to the several nations to carry out the proposals in the way that seemed best. The conference concluded on 6 July 1867, with a stance favorable to the gold standard (as was Parieu's preference) but recognition that the transition from bimetallism would be gradual.

The aftermath proved that the obstacles to international standardization of currency were insurmountable. The British government could not obtain the assent of a Royal Commission to the pegging of the sovereign to the 25-franc piece. The course of political events soon completely altered the relative position of the leading countries, including in their monetary relations. Germany and the United States reformed their currencies in the 1870s without reference to any international considerations.

== See also ==
- International Monetary and Economic Conferences
