= Tripartite Agreement of 1936 =

The Tripartite Agreement was an international monetary agreement entered into by the United States, France, and Great Britain in September 1936. The purpose of the agreement was to stabilize their nations' currencies both at home and in the international exchange markets after the collapse of the international monetary system during the Great Depression.

== History ==
During the Great Depression, international monetary cooperation collapsed among liberal states. Following suspension of the gold standard by Great Britain in 1931 and the United States in 1933, a serious imbalance developed between their currencies and those of the gold bloc countries, particularly France. The devaluation of the dollar and the pound sterling raised import prices and lowered export prices in the United States and Great Britain.

In the United States and Great Britain sound money advocates were divided between those favoring reforms to stabilize the currency and others who called for an end to the gold standard and a managed currency.

== Agreement ==
The Tripartite Agreement was informal and provisional. Subscribing nations agreed to refrain from competitive depreciation to maintain currency values at existing levels, as long as that attempt did not interfere seriously with internal prosperity. France devalued its currency as part of the agreement. The remaining gold bloc nations, Belgium, Switzerland, and the Netherlands, also subscribed to the agreement.

Subscribing nations agreed to sell one another gold in the seller's currency at a price agreed in advance. The agreement stabilized exchange rates, ending the currency war of 1931 to 1936, but it failed to help the recovery of world trade.

== See also ==
- Gold standard
- London Gold Pool
