= Félix Esquirou de Parieu =

French statesman (1815–1893)

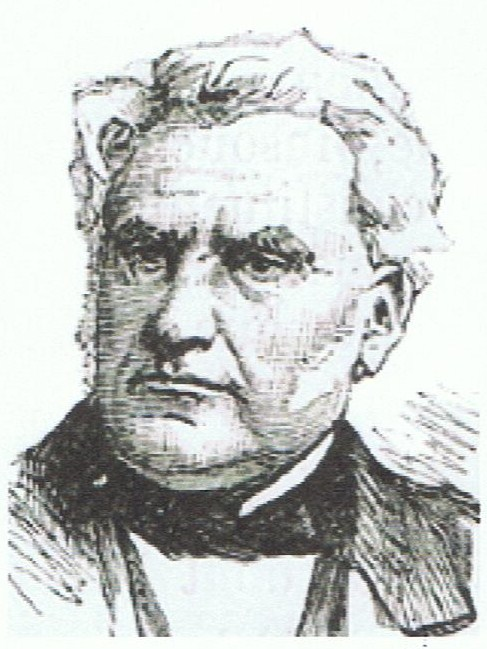
Félix Esquirou de Parieu.

Marie-Louis-Pierre Félix Esquirou de Parieu (13 April 1815 – 8 April 1893) was a French statesman.

== Life ==
Born in Aurillac, Cantal, Esquirou de Parieu was notably Minister of Education and Public Worship from 1849 to 1851, and headed the French Council of State in 1870.

== Monetary Union and early European visionary ==
Parieu was one of the most eminent French specialists in monetary questions and, from 1858, he was an early advocate of European monetary unification. He chaired the Monetary Conference of 1865, which gave birth to the Latin Monetary Union, which was largely his work, as well as the unsuccessful Monetary Conference of 1867, which attempted to expand this union into a European, even global, union founded on a universal coinage.

This invitation to adopt a common coinage was the result of economic factors linked to the development of free trade and the emergence of the first federalist ideas in Europe.

As early as 1865, Parieu expressed the intention of the French government to transform the Latin Monetary Union and to consider “a broader perspective, that of a uniform monetary circulation for all of Europe. He proposed in 1867 to introduce a common currency based on the 10 franc coin, called "Europe", in a "Western European Union".

According to him, a European Monetary Union based on the gold standard would offer "a rich and comfortable metallic circulation [and] the gradual destruction in the economic order of one of those frequent barriers which divide nations, and whose reduction would facilitate their mutual moral conquest, thus serving as a prelude to the peaceful federations of the future."

This reference to the peaceful federations of the future is all the more revealing as Parieu anticipated, in his book Principes de Science Politique, published in 1870, the institutional structure of the future European Union. He described a “European Union” led by a “European Commission” whose members would be appointed by national governments, later joined by a “European Parliament”. This federation was to prevent European wars and bring about the pooling of currency, transport, post and diplomatic representations.

Parieu was aware of the visionary nature of his ambitions and declared to a skeptical Imperial Senate in 1870: “In the history of mankind, the generous utopia of yesterday can be transformed into a practical and feasible creation of tomorrow, because the world has progressed."

He was elected as a member to the American Philosophical Society in 1871.
