= Brussels International Financial Conference (1920) =

International economic conference

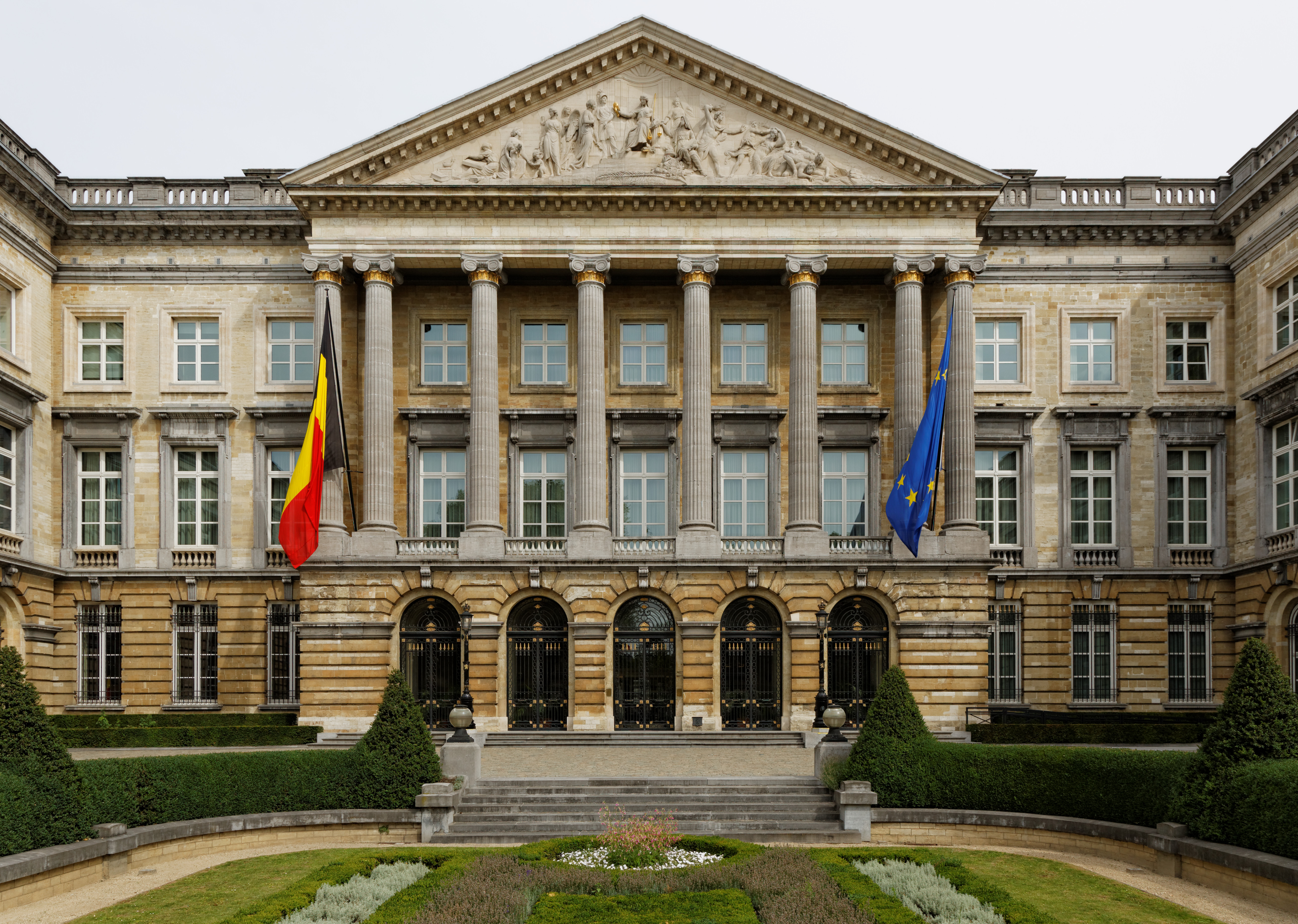
Palace of the Nation in Brussels, where the conference was held

The International Financial Conference was an international economic conference held in Brussels from September 25 to October 8, 1920.

86 delegates, representing 39 states, were present at the conference. Most delegates were bankers or treasury officials.

== Background ==
The Brussels conference was convened in the context of severe economic, social, financial and sanitary dislocation immediately following World War I, especially in Central and Eastern Europe. Its trigger was an international petition published in January 1920 and signed by prominent individuals that included Gustave Ador, Gustav Cassel, Robert Cecil, Herbert Hoover, J. P. Morgan Jr., Richard Vassar Vassar-Smith, Gerard Vissering, Paul Warburg, and other signatories from Denmark, France and Norway. Because of the general sense of impending failure, national governments decided that delegates would not officially represent them, so that the governments would not be overly tainted if the conference came to nothing. Even so, nearly three-quarters of the delegates were government officials, the rest being central and private bankers, while the other participants including some non-financial businesspeople and academics.

== Conference ==
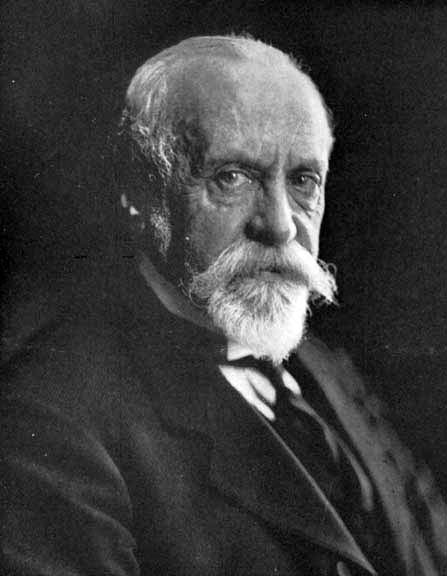
Former Swiss President Gustave Ador (1845-1928) chaired the conference's proceedings

Jean Monnet, at the time the deputy secretary-general of the fledgling League of Nations, was instrumental in the preparation of the conference. Preparatory technical materials included documents prepared by the staff of the League, including a reference volume on Currencies after the War and papers on themes such as Coal Statistics, Currency Statistics, Exchange Control, International Trade, or Public Finance. These were complemented by five papers commissioned by League Secretariat official Walter Layton from some of the most recognized economists of the era, namely Sweden's Gustav Cassel, the United Kingdom's Arthur Cecil Pigou, the Netherlands' Gijsbert Weijer Jan Bruins, France's Charles Gide, and Italy's Maffeo Pantaleoni.

The conference was chaired by former Swiss President Gustave Ador and attended by 86 delegates from 39 countries. The venue for the conference proceedings was the Palace of the Nation, relying on a secretariat composed mainly of League staff and housed in the nearby Academy Palace. Discussions were held simultaneously in French and English.

== Assessment ==
With hindsight, the conference was rather successful at defining a set of general principles for postwar stabilization around shared aspirations to fiscal discipline, free trade, and sound monetary policy led by independent central banks, a "standard of financial orthodoxy" on which the delegates reached a remarkably broad consensus. A resolution stating that "In countries where there is no central bank of issue, one should be established" was passed unanimously. While the medium-term objectives were clear, the delegates also stated that the return to the gold standard should only be envisaged after proper financial stabilization and structural adjustment. These principles guided, in particular, the early activity of the League's Economic and Financial Organization (EFO) that was being established at the same time. The Brussels Conference has also been recognized as having played a decisive role in the creation of central banks in Latin America.

The conference specifically called for the EFO to prepare a report on how the national governments would implement their recommendations. That report was duly published in 1922 and has been viewed as an early predecessor of surveillance reports issued decades later by the International Monetary Fund.

Describing austerity, Robert Brand argued economic recovery after World War I required that "We must all work hard, live hard, and save hard."

== See also ==
- Brussels Conference (1892)
- International Monetary and Economic Conferences
- League of Nations
- International political economy
