= Battle of Pozzolo =

1800 battle during the Second Coalition

- Part of the Italian campaigns in the War of the Second Coalition
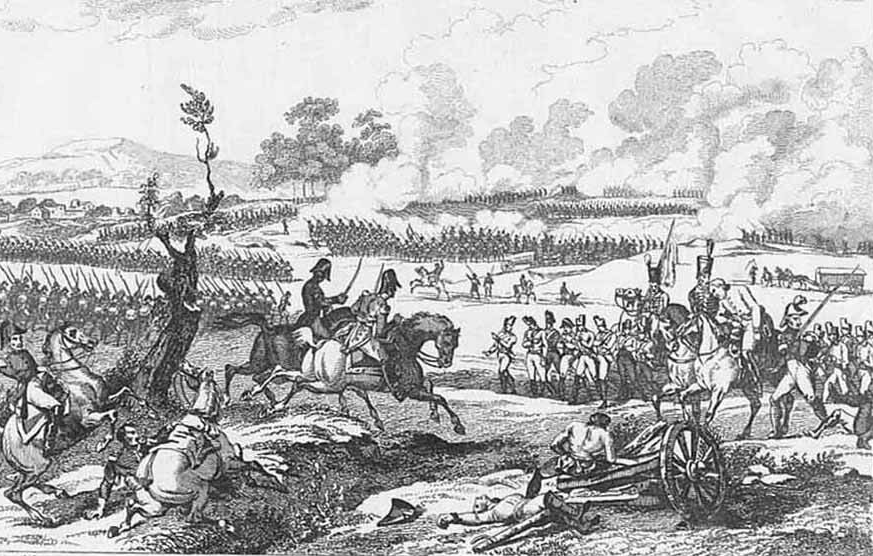
- 1836 print depicting part of the battle
Date	25–26 December 1800
Location	Town on the Mincio River, present-day Monzambano, Italy 45.3833°N 10.7000°E
Result	French victory

Belligerents
France	Austria

Commanders and leaders
Guillaume Brune	Heinrich von Bellegarde

Strength
66,000–70,000 men 160 guns	50,000 men 100 guns

Casualties and losses
4,000 men	7,000–9,141 men 29–40 guns
- Location within Europe

The Battle of Pozzolo also known as the Battle of the Mincio River and Monzambano (25–26 December 1800) was fought during the War of the Second Coalition. A French army under General Guillaume Brune crossed the Mincio River and defeated an Austrian force under General Heinrich von Bellegarde. The Austrians were subsequently pushed back to Treviso where the Armistice of Treviso was signed. This truce would lead to the Treaty of Lunéville and the withdrawal of Austria from the war.

== Background ==
Bellegarde had concentrated 50,000 troops at the Mincio river in anticipation of crossing to attack French forces on the other side. However, he postponed his attack following news of the Austrian defeat at the Battle of Hohenlinden in Germany on 3 December 1800. Taking advantage of this delay, General Brune, who commanded 70,000 men, launched his own attack. He intended to make a decoy assault upon Pozzolo while his main force would cross at Mozambano. Another source credited the French with 66,000 soldiers and 160 guns and the Austrians with 38,000 infantry, 12,000 cavalry, and 100 guns.

== Forces ==
Brune's Army of Italy consisted of Right, Center, and Left Wings, an Advanced Guard, and a Reserve. Antoine Guillaume Delmas led the Advance Guard which numbered 10,510 soldiers, including 1,240 cavalry and 160 gunners with 12 artillery pieces. Pierre Dupont de l'Étang commanded the Right Wing which counted 9,760 infantry, 810 cavalry, and 380 artillerists with 28 guns. The Right Wing included two divisions under Jean-Charles Monnier and François Watrin. Louis-Gabriel Suchet directed the Center with 12,360 infantry, 1,120 cavalry, and no guns. The Center had two divisions under Louis Henri Loison and Honoré Théodore Maxime Gazan de la Peyrière. Bon-Adrien Jeannot de Moncey led the Left Wing which numbered 13,020 infantry, no cavalry, and 420 gunners with 17 artillery pieces. The Left Wing's two divisions were under Jean Boudet and Donatien-Marie-Joseph de Vimeur, vicomte de Rochambeau. Louis-Nicolas Davout and Claude Ignace François Michaud commanded the Reserve with 10,910 infantry, 4,380 cavalry, and 1,100 artillerists with 103 guns. Gaspard Amédée Gardanne led one division and François Étienne de Kellermann led the heavy cavalry division.

== Battle ==
Dupont's corps crossed the river near Pozzolo on Christmas Day 1800 under heavy Austrian artillery fire. This force made a feint on Pozzolo whilst a temporary bridge was constructed at nearby Molino della Bolta. Dupont moved two divisions and a battery of 25 artillery pieces across the new bridge and constructed defences.

Following reinforcement from Suchet, the French defeated an Austrian midday counterattack and successfully took the village of Pozzolo. A second Austrian attack launched at 1:00 pm and was formed of Hungarian troops led by Konrad Valentin von Kaim. They retook the village and forced the French back to their bridgehead. Heavy French artillery fire prevented further progress and a renewed French assault recaptured the village, taking five guns and 700-800 prisoners.

Suchet then constructed a second bridge which allowed a whole French division to cross the river unopposed. The village of Pozzolo was bitterly fought over, changing hands a further three times before a final French assault secured it just before dusk. It was during this fighting that General Kaim was mortally wounded. During the night, the Austrians took advantage of a clear moonlit night to attack the French bivouacs.

From 5:00 am on 26 December French troops constructed another bridge at Monzambano, under the cover of dense fog and supporting fire from 40 guns. They then launched an assault upon the Monte Bianco hills, which were held by around 35,000 Austrians. The Austrians were driven back to Salionze and a French force under Delmas captured Valeggio sul Mincio. Later in the day an Austrian counterattack briefly retook the village before Delmas finally secured it. The French reinforced their positions during the afternoon and defeated an Austrian counterattack in the hills.

Austrian losses in the battle were around 7,000 men and 40 guns. A second source asserted that the French sustained 4,000 casualties, including General of Brigade André Calvin killed. The Austrians suffered losses of 807 killed, 4,067 wounded, 3,984 captured, and 313 missing, or a total of 9,171. General officer losses were Kaim killed and Charles Alain Gabriel de Rohan wounded. The French captured 14 3-pounder, six 6-pounder, and three 12-pounder cannons, and six 7-pounder howitzers.

== Aftermath ==
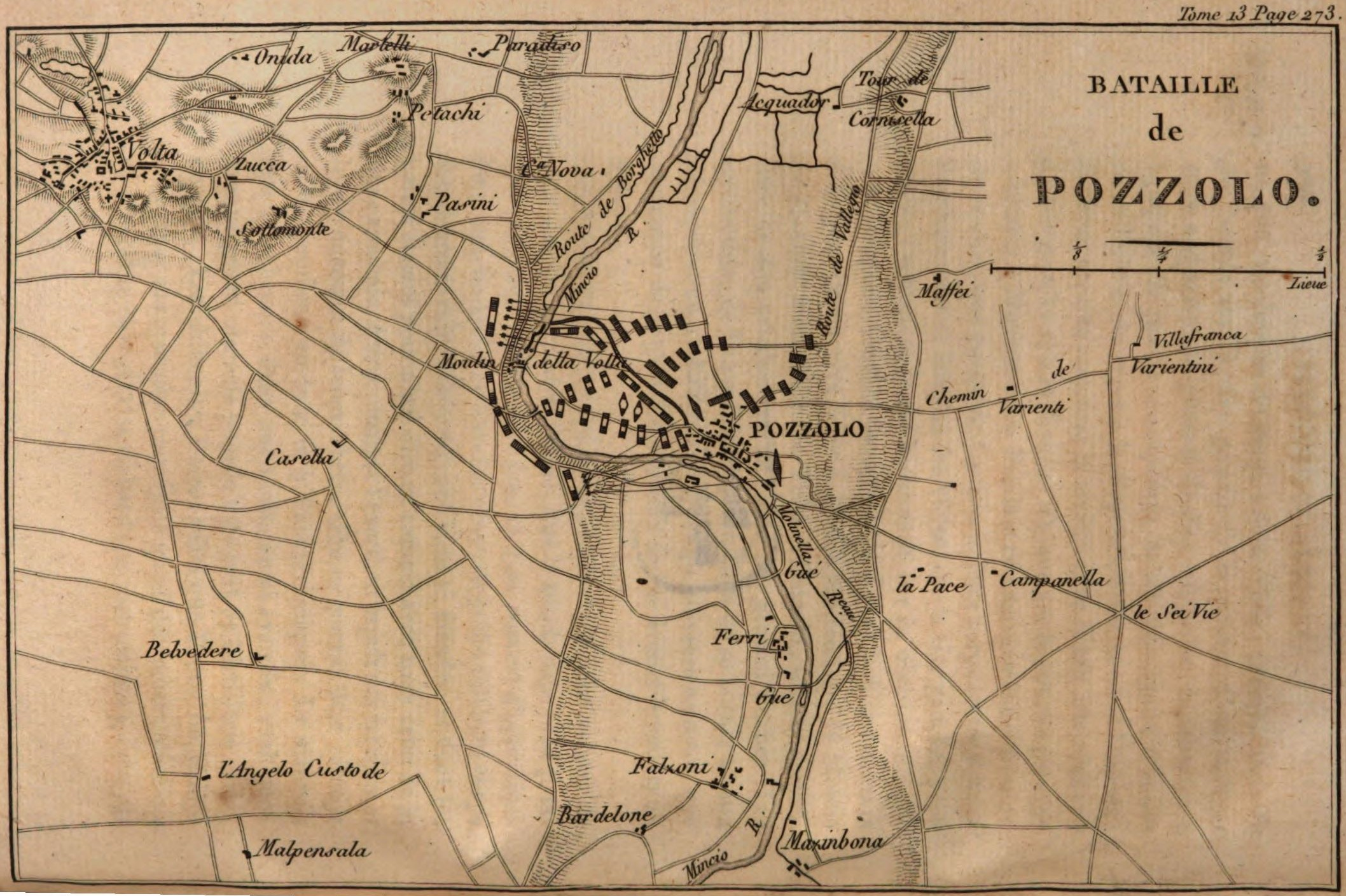
An 1819 map showing the opening stages of the battle

Bellegarde withdrew his forces overnight on 26-27 December and pulled back beyond the Adige river. Brune cautiously followed up the Austrian retreat and paused at the river to await the arrival of his pontoon bridging teams. Bellegarde withdrew his troops further to attempt to join with some reinforcements which allowed the French to cross the Adige river unopposed.

After a series of small engagements, the French reached Treviso where an armistice was signed on 16 January 1801. The cessation of hostilities was made permanent with the Treaty of Lunéville on 9 February 1801, which ended the Austrian involvement in the war.
