= Armistice of Steyr =

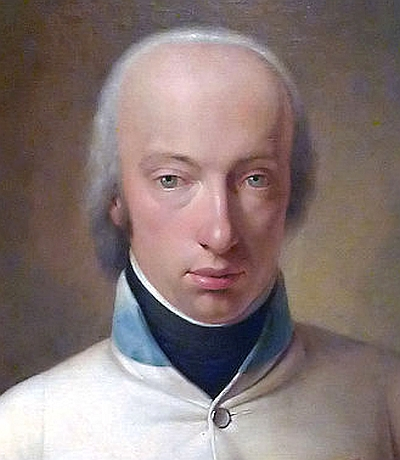
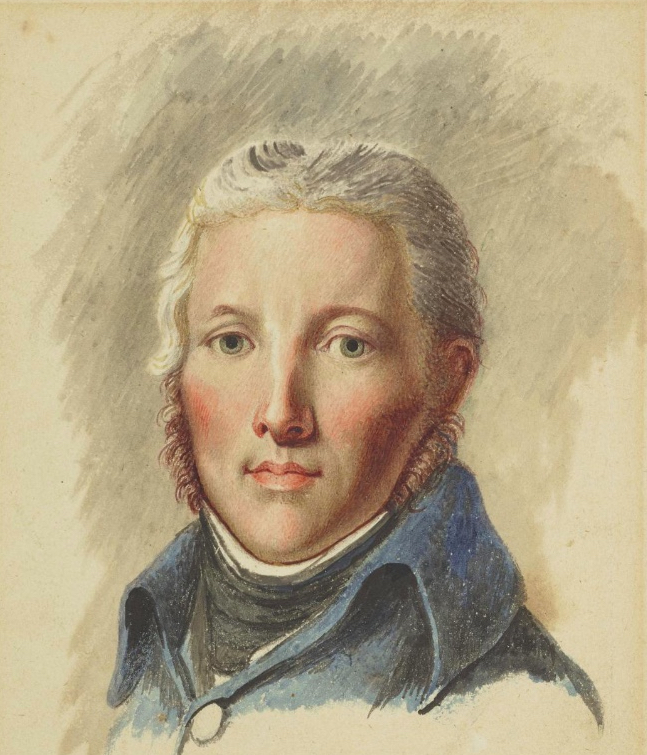
Archduke Charles (left) and General Moreau (right)

The Armistice of Steyr (or Steyer) was a ceasefire agreement between the forces of the Holy Roman Empire and the French Republic that ended active hostilities in the War of the Second Coalition in Germany. It was signed on 25 December 1800 in the Austrian town of Steyr by Archduke Charles of Austria and the French commander, Jean Victor Moreau.

Following the French victory at Hohenlinden on 3 December, the archduke took command of the imperial armies in Germany on 17 December. His priority was signing an armistice. The imperial armies were in disarray, but Moreau had bypassed several Austrian fortresses, which could threaten his lines of communication. There were French cavalry outposts only 40 miles (64 km) from Vienna.

On 18 December, Emperor Francis II's foreign minister, Johann Amadeus von Thugut, drafted new instructions for his plenipotentiary in Paris, Ludwig von Cobenzl. Although Thugut opposed an armistice and preferred to fight "to the knife", he instructed Cobenzl to seek a preliminary peace agreement in order to obtain an armistice. On 23 December, Thugut drafted a formal imperial rescript to Cobenzl authorizing peace negotiations, which has been called the "epitaph" of his policy and which he called the "epitaph of the Monarchy and the glory of Austria". By the time the instructions of the 18th reached Cobenzl on 26 December, the archduke had already signed an armistice the day before.

The armistice of Steyr applied only to Germany and was to last thirty days. Fighting between imperial and French forces continued in Italy. In Italy, the imperial general Heinrich von Bellegarde had to seek a separate armistice with his French counterpart, Guillaume Brune. The armistice of Treviso was signed on 16 January, although news of it was late in reaching Paris.

Since the emperor had pledged to Great Britain not to make peace with France before February, he intended to drag out peace negotiations at least that long. On 27 December, the emperor informed King George III of Great Britain that he was unable to fulfill his obligations to the alliance and was treating with France. On 31 December, Cobenzl officially informed the French that he would sign a peace treaty without Britain.

The Treaty of Lunéville that formally ended the war was signed on 9 February 1801.
