= Armistice of Treviso =

1801 treaty between France and Austria

- Type: Ceasefire treaty
- Context: Ended fighting between France and Austria in the War of the Second Coalition
- Signed: 16 January 1801
- Location: Treviso, Venetian Province of the Habsburg Empire
- Expiration: Supplanted by the Treaty of Lunéville on 9 February 1801
- Original signatories: Guillaume Brune (France) Heinrich von Bellegarde (Austria)
- Parties: French First Republic Habsburg Empire (Austria)

The Armistice of Treviso was a ceasefire signed on 16 January 1801, in Treviso, Italy, between French General Guillaume Brune and the Austrians during the War of the Second Coalition. Brune had defeated Austrian General Heinrich von Bellegarde at the Battle of Pozzolo on 25 December 1800 and drove Generals Josef Philipp Vukassovich and Johann Ludwig Alexius von Loudon from a succession of defensive positions in the mountains. Bellegarde retreated to Treviso and prepared for its defence but agreed to a ceasefire. Under the terms the Austrians ceded many towns in northern Italy but retained Mantua. Napoleon desired the city, which was within striking distance of a French force, and as a result was displeased with Brune, who had promised that Mantua would form part of any armistice deal. However, following French victories in Tuscany and Germany, the French were able to negotiate the ceding of Mantua as part of the Treaty of Lunéville of 9 February 1801.

== Background ==
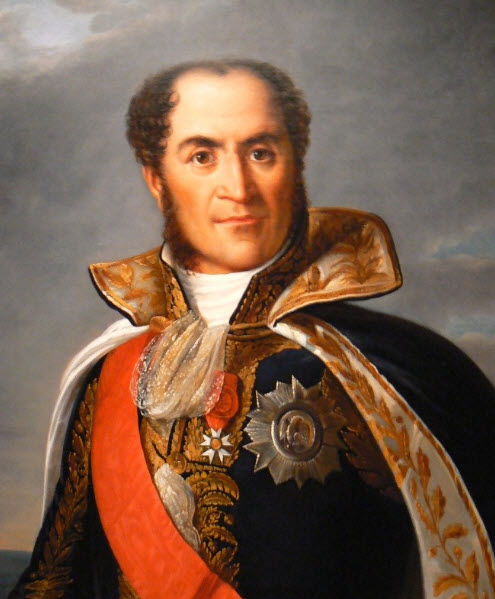
French General Guillaume Brune

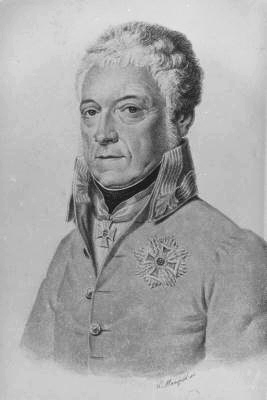
Austrian General Heinrich von Bellegarde

The French were engaged in a campaign in northern Italy against the Archduchy of Austria, the Grand Duchy of Tuscany and the Kingdom of Naples as part of the War of the Second Coalition. French General Guillaume Brune won a hard-fought victory over the Austrians, under General Heinrich von Bellegarde, at the Battle of Pozzolo on Christmas Day 1800. This allowed Brune to cautiously advance across the Mincio River.

Brune was able to cross the Adige river unopposed as Bellegarde pulled back, keen to join Josef Philipp Vukassovich and Johann Ludwig Alexius von Loudon whose 20,000 troops were moving down the Brenta river to the plain of Bassano. Bellegarde held his forces at Caldiero, intending to provide time for Laudon and Vukassovich to assemble, but was driven from that position by Brune.

A French force under Bon-Adrien Jeannot de Moncey pursued Laudon and drove him from successive positions at Alta, St Marco and Roveredo to La Pietra. Laudon was isolated there by the capture of Trent from Vukassovich by a force of 9,000 men under French General Jacques MacDonald. Laudon's only line of retreat was a mountain path to Levico, passable only by a single man at a time. He was threatened by Moncey's force who could now be reinforced at short notice by MacDonald. Laudon sent an emissary to Moncey stating falsely that Bellegarde had agreed an armistice with Brune. Moncey did not suspect foul play and allowed Laudon to withdraw via the pass to Levico. In return Laudon granted Moncey un-contested possession of the pass to Trent, Moncey not being aware that that town was already occupied by MacDonald.

In Germany, a French victory at the Battle of Hohenlinden on 3 December and the subsequent capture of Steyr left Jean Victor Marie Moreau's forces only 65 kilometres (40 mi) from the Austrian capital at Vienna. On 18 December, the Habsburg foreign minister, Johann Amadeus von Thugut, drafted new instructions for his ambassador in Paris, Philipp von Cobenzl. Although Thugut opposed an armistice and preferred to fight "to the knife", he instructed Cobenzl to seek a preliminary peace agreement in order to obtain an armistice. On 23 December, Thugut drafted a formal imperial rescript to Cobenzl authorizing peace negotiations, which has been called the "epitaph" of his policy and which he called the "epitaph of the Monarchy and the glory of Austria". By the time the instructions of the 18th reached Cobenzl on 26 December, the armistice of Steyr had already been signed the day before. That agreement, however, was only binding in Germany. Fighting continued in Italy while Cobenzl in Paris and the generals on the ground each sought an armistice.

== Agreement ==
Bellegarde was isolated by the retreats of his subordinates and his 35,000 men were outnumbered by the 45,000 under Brune. He withdrew to a point in front of Treviso and began to prepare a defensive position. However, before battle was joined the Armistice of Treviso was signed on 16 January 1801.

Brune had on 13 January promised Napoleon that he would not conclude an armistice with the Austrians that did not hand Mantua, a key objective of Napoleon, to the French. However, with his army weakened by the mountain crossings, combat losses and detachments to blockade towns in the rear, Brune agreed to a treaty that excluded Mantua. His fear was that otherwise the Austrians, reinforced with troops from Tyrol, could attack the French on the open plains near Treviso with fresh cavalry forces. The armistice of Treviso handed Peschiera, Verona, Legnago, Ancona and Ferrara to France. Austrian forces would remain in control of Mantua, which the Emperor Francis II called "the bulwark of the Empire". The French blockade of the city would remain in force, but it would be receive ten days' worth of supplies at a time.

== Aftermath ==
Cobenzl was not informed of the armistice of Treviso before, around noon on 25 January, he began a marathon session of negotiations to extended the armistice of Steyr, which was set to expire the following day, and to procure an armistice for Italy. The following morning, the two sides in Paris agreed to an armistice covering both Italy and Germany. This agreement took into account the possibility that the commanders in Italy had already signed an armistice and gave such an agreement precedence with one exception:

Dans le cas où les généraux en chef des armées respectives en Italie auraient arrêté une convention d'armistice avant que la présente parvienne à leur connaissance, celle conclue par lesdits généraux sera seule exécutée, bien entendu que l'évacuation des cinq places stipulée dans l'article I^{er} aura lieu dans tous les cas.

In the case where the generals in command of the respective armies in Italy have concluded an armistice convention before the present one comes to their knowledge, that concluded by the aforementioned generals shall alone be executed, understanding that the evacuation of the five places stipulated in the first article shall take place in any case.

The five fortresses to be surrendered were Mantua, Peschiera, Legnano, Ferrara and Ancona. This had been a longstanding demand of First Consul Napoleon Bonaparte, resisted by Cobenzl until the very end. In light of the news of Treviso, the concession of Mantua was an "irretrievable blunder" caused by poor Habsburg communications.

General Joachim Murat defeated the Neapolitan army in Tuscany. The latter country was saved from occupation by the intervention of the pro-French Russian Tsar, but in the subsequent Armistice of Folgano was forced to withdraw from the coalition and close its ports to British ships. Austria was therefore isolated and under great pressure concluded the Treaty of Lunéville with France on 9 February 1801. This included the ceding of Mantua to France and the withdrawal of Austria from the war of the second coalition. This left the British to continue the war alone until they themselves concluded peace in the 1802 Treaty of Amiens.

Napoleon was displeased with the armistice, which came as a surprise to him. Murat's troops were almost within striking distance of Mantua at the time it was concluded. Napoleon's disapproval was such that he never again granted Brune an important command.
