= Italian campaigns of the French Revolutionary Wars =

French invasion and partial annexation of Italy

Italian campaigns
- Part of the French Revolutionary Wars
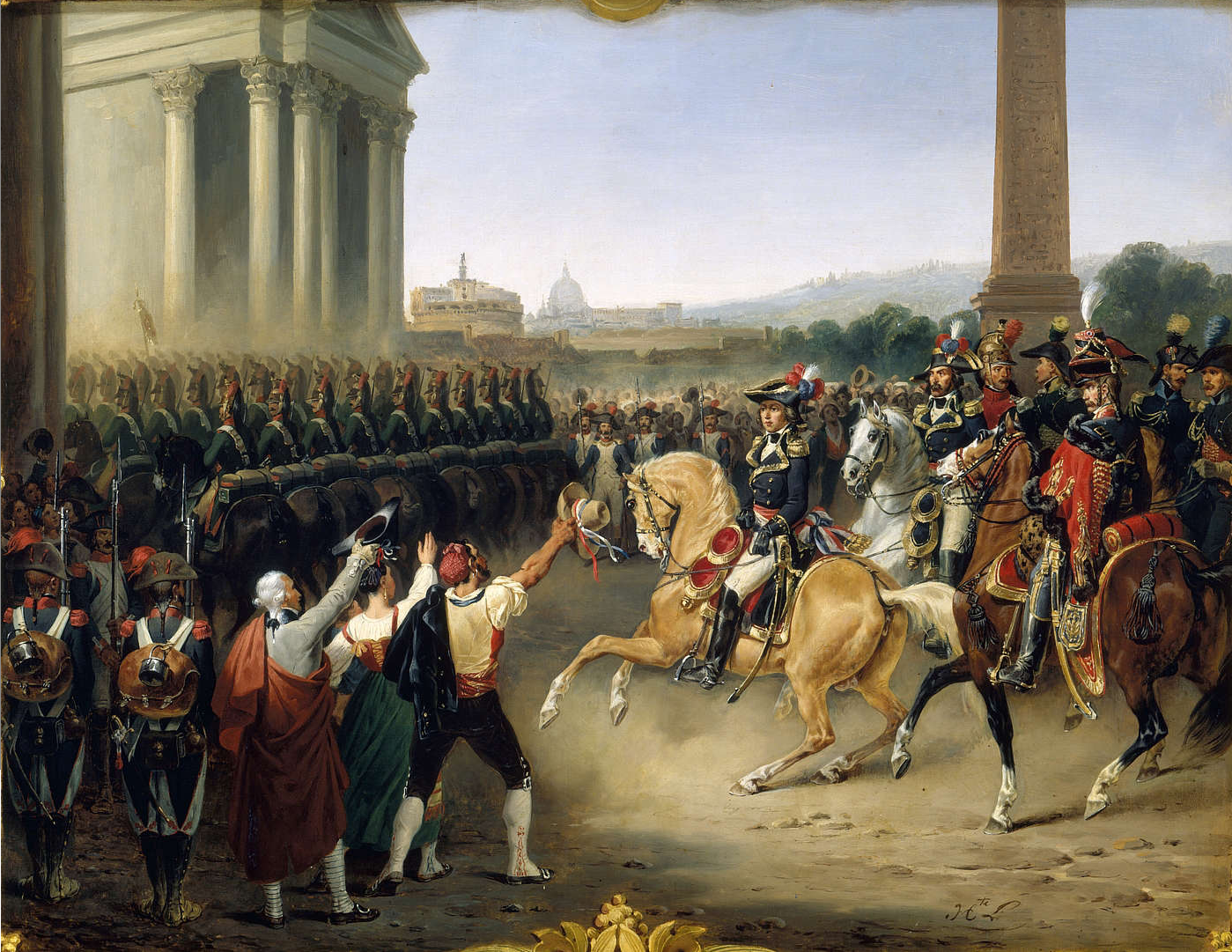
- French troops entering Rome on 15 February 1798
Date	20 April 1792 – 9 February 1801
Location	Northern Italy and Central Italy
Result	French victory: Treaty of Campo Formio (1797); Treaty of Lunéville (1801)
Territorial changes	Republic of Venice partitioned between Austria and France; French client states established in Italy

Belligerents
First Coalition: French Republic; Second Coalition: French Republic: Helvetic Republic; (Kingdom of Italy (Napoleonic)) Cisalpine Republic; (Kingdom of Italy (Napoleonic)) Roman Republic (until 1799)	First Coalition: Habsburg Monarchy; Kingdom of Sardinia (until 1796); Naples (until 1796); Other Italian states: Republic of Venice (1796); Papal States (1796); Second Coalition: Habsburg Monarchy; Russian Empire (until 1799); Naples (until 1801); Tuscany (until 1801)

Commanders and leaders
(French First Republic) Napoleon Bonaparte (French First Republic) André Masséna (French First Republic) François Kellermann (French First Republic) Jean Moreau (French First Republic) Louis-Alexandre Berthier (French First Republic) Pierre Augereau (French First Republic) Louis-Gabriel Suchet (French First Republic) Amédée Laharpe † (French First Republic) Thomas-Alexandre Dumas (French First Republic) Jean-Mathieu-Philibert Sérurier	(Habsburg monarchy) Francis II (Habsburg monarchy) Dagobert von Wurmser (Habsburg monarchy) József Alvinczi (Russian Empire) Paul I (1798–1799) (Russian Empire) Alexander Suvorov (Kingdom of Naples) Ferdinand IV (Tuscany) Ferdinand III; Michael Colli

The Italian campaigns of the French Revolutionary Wars (1792–1801) were a series of conflicts fought principally in Northern Italy between the French Revolutionary Army and a Coalition of Austria, Russia, Piedmont-Sardinia, and a number of other Italian states.

The campaign of 1796-1797 brought prominence to Napoleon Bonaparte, a young, largely unknown commander, who led French forces to victory over numerically superior Austrian and Sardinian armies.

== First Coalition (1792–1797) ==
The War of the First Coalition broke out in autumn 1792, when several European powers formed an alliance against Republican France. The first major operation was the annexation of the County of Nice and the Duchy of Savoy (both states of the Kingdom of Piedmont-Sardinia) by 30,000 French troops. This was reversed in mid-1793, when the Republican forces were withdrawn to deal with a revolt in Lyon, triggering a counter-invasion of Savoy by the Kingdom of Piedmont-Sardinia (a member of the First Coalition). After the revolt in Lyon had been suppressed, the French under General Kellermann managed to push back the Piedmontese with just 12,000 troops, winning engagements at Argentines and St Maurice in September and October 1793.

The conflict soon escalated with Austrian and Neapolitan forces being mobilised for an invasion of southern France to recover Nice and strike into Provence. The Allied forces were bolstered by some 45,000 Austrians, Piedmontese, and Neapolitans, with additional support from the British Royal Navy. Before the Allies could launch this assault the French, under tactical command of André Masséna, launched the Saorgio Offensive (April, 1794), which was planned by the army's artillery commander, General Napoleon Bonaparte. This two-pronged French offensive drove back the Allied force, despite their strong positions, and firmly captured the mountain passes that led into Piedmont.

A further offensive, also designed by General Bonaparte to exploit the victory at Saorgio, was called off under orders from war minister Carnot, who was concerned about supply lines being cut by rebels behind the front. The commanders in the field were unhappy about this decision, but appeals were interrupted by the overthrow of the Committee of Public Safety and its leader, Maximilien de Robespierre (28 July 1794). During the political chaos that ensued in the French army, the Allies launched an assault on Savona. Ignoring Carnot's orders, the commander of the French Army of Italy, André Masséna, launched a counter-offensive and secured supply routes to Genoa following victory at the First Battle of Dego. Following this the French consolidated the front and awaited further opportunities.

The main focus of the war then shifted north to the Rhine, until 29 June 1795, when the Austrians launched an attack against the depleted and poorly supplied Army of Italy. Nominally 107,000-strong, the Army of Italy could only manage to field an effective force of about 30,000. Kellermann, who had resumed command, appealed to Carnot for reinforcements. Instead, General Bonaparte was appointed to the general staff where he devised a third plan for an attack towards Vado and Ceva. Kellermann was replaced by General Schérer soon after and he carried out the attacks, gaining victory at Loano.

=== Bonaparte's war ===
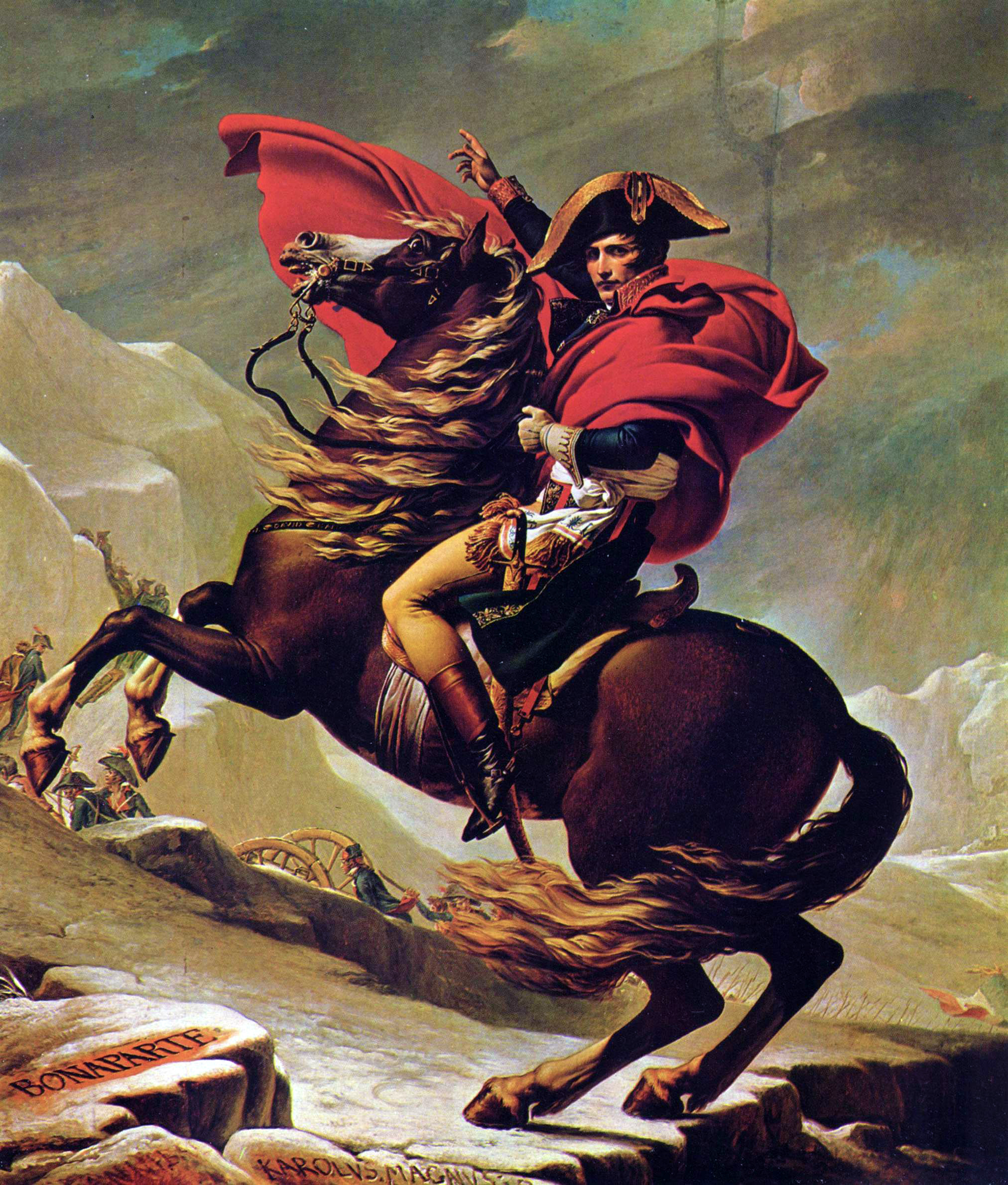
Napoleon Crossing the Alps by Jacques-Louis David.

Bonaparte was appointed commander-in-chief on 2 March 1796. The motives for Bonaparte's appointment were most likely political. On 9 March, Bonaparte had married Joséphine de Beauharnais, who had shared her imprisonment (under Robespierre) with Thérésa Tallien, wife to Tallien, one of the then Directors of the French Republic. Josephine's letters claim Barras had promised the command to Bonaparte, before she'd consented to marry him.

Barras is cited by his colleagues as saying of Bonaparte, "Advance this man or he will advance himself without you." Bonaparte had shown himself to be highly ambitious and had made a name for himself following 13 Vendémiaire in 1795. By placing him in command of the Army of Italy, Bonaparte was being assigned to an obscure front: of the Republic's thirteen principal field armies, the Italian force was the most neglected and was in terrible condition when Bonaparte arrived.

Bonaparte launched attacks almost immediately after he arrived on the front on 27 March. His 38,000 men and 60 guns were facing more than 50,000 Allied troops in the theatre. His only chance of support came from Kellermann's Army of the Alps, which was faced by a further 20,000 Allied troops. Bonaparte had no chance of gaining reinforcements as the Republican war effort was being concentrated on the massive offensives planned on the Rhine.

At the Battle of Montenotte, Bonaparte defeated the Austrians and fought a second engagement around Dego soon after. Following these battles he launched an all-out invasion of Piedmont and won a further victory at Mondovì. Sardinia was forced to accept the Armistice of Cherasco on 28 April, knocking it out of the war and the First Coalition. It had taken Bonaparte just a month to defeat Sardinia (between his arrival and the armistice), a country which had resisted the French armies for over three years. Total losses during the lightning campaign were 6,000 French troops and over 25,000 Allied.

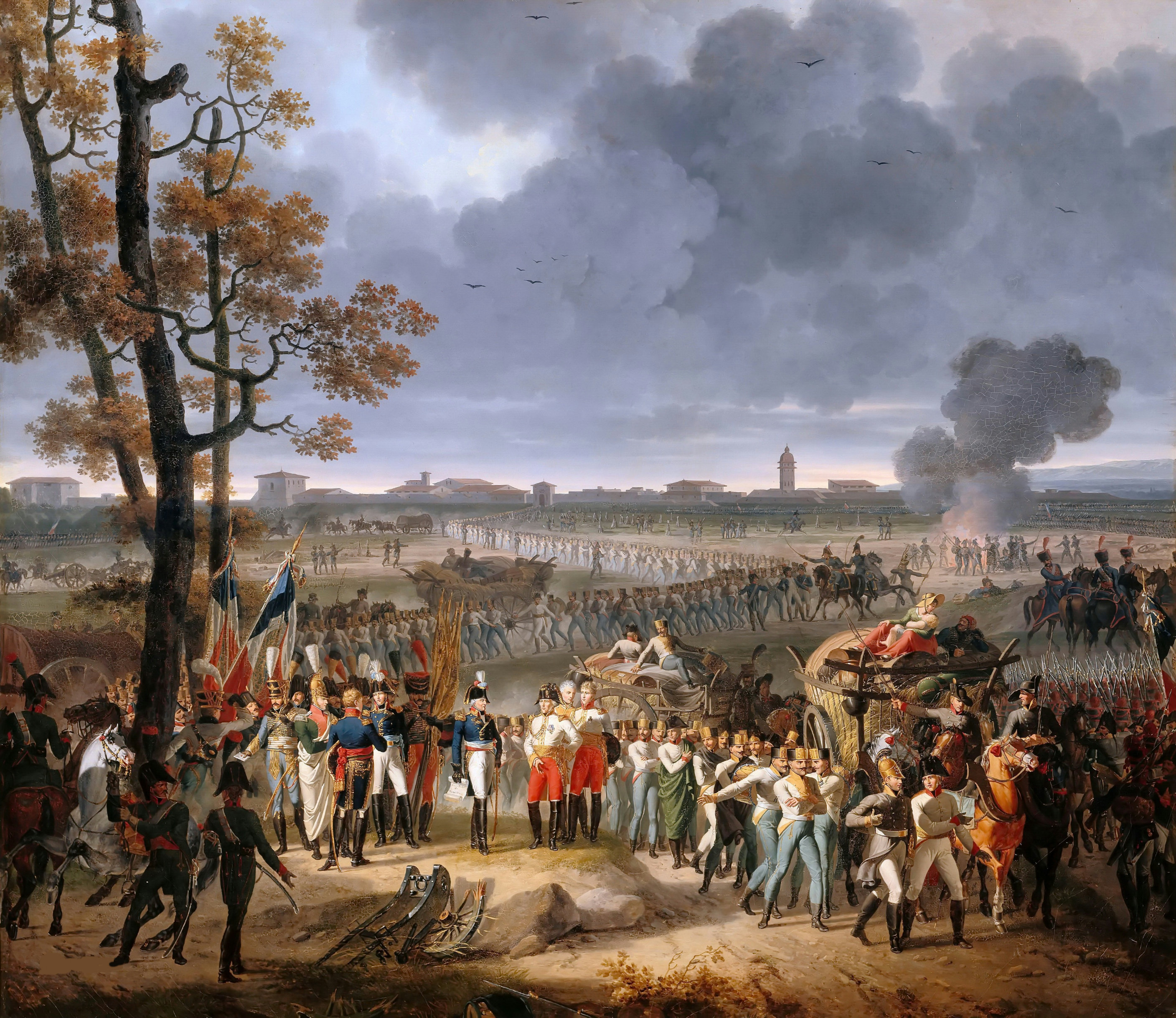
The Siege of Mantua ended in a French victory.

Bonaparte reorganised his newly enthused army following the short let-up in operations that followed Sardinia's defeat. Following this he manoeuvred his army into more opportune positions along the Po River. A small French victory at Codogno led to a retreat by Coalition forces across the Adda River. At the river, the Austrian army of General Beaulieu was defeated in the Battle of Lodi on 10 May.

The Army of Italy was now reinforced to almost 50,000 men and Bonaparte continued on the offensive, striking at Austrian forces mobilising in the vicinity of the fortress of Mantua. A series of minor Coalition defeats resulted in the garrison at Mantua being reinforced to 12,000. Placing Mantua under siege, Bonaparte then led a French division south to invade and occupy the Grand Duchy of Tuscany and the Papal States, defeating Papal forces at Fort Urban.

Next he turned north and with 20,000 men defeated some 50,000 Austrians under Field Marshal Wurmser at the battles of Lonato and Castiglione. The Austrian commander was forced back into the Alps.

Wurmser was reinforced once again to compensate for some 20,000 losses sustained in the past two months and made an attempt to relieve the siege of Mantua. Some 45,000 Austrian troops were left behind to guard against any new French offensive whilst the main body of the Austrian army moved on Mantua. At Rovereto on 4 September, Bonaparte inflicted a heavy defeat on the Austrians and was then well-placed to strike at the rear of Wurmser's army. Reacting slowly to this new threat, the Austrians were again defeated at the Battle of Bassano, where their army was reduced to just 12,000. The remaining troops marched rapidly towards Mantua, but became trapped there by General Masséna's advance party.

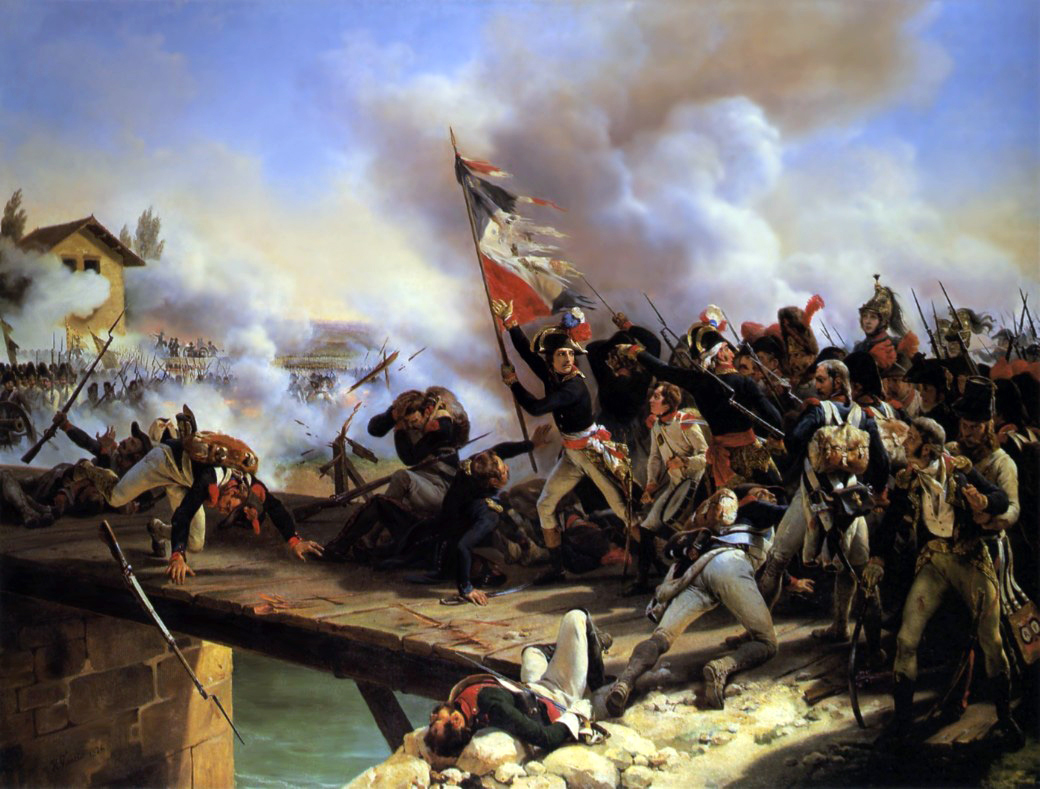
The Crossing of the Arcole Bridge by Horace Vernet, 1826. General Bonaparte and his troops crossing the bridge of Arcole.

Additional Austrian forces arrived whilst Bonaparte's army was weakened by disease and his supply lines threatened by rebellion. Government political commissars, especially Cristoforo Saliceti, brutally put down the uprisings, but the French position was weakened. To stabilise the situation Bonaparte created the client states of the Transpadane Republic and the Cispadane Republic.

Following this a new Austrian commander, Joseph Alvinczy, arrived and made another attempt to relieve Mantua. Bonaparte halted and drove Alvinczy back across the Brenta river, but his counter-offensive was seriously hampered by Vaubois’ defeat over five days in the villages of Cembra and Calliano under Alvinczy's lieutenant, Paul Davidovitch, and he was forced to retreat to Verona. Alvinczy, following Bonaparte, held off a French attack at Caldiero on 12 November and Bonaparte was forced to withdraw. In the following three-day Battle of Arcole, Bonaparte, fighting outnumbered and faced with the failure of his repeated efforts to capture a pivotal bridge at Arcole, won an important and hard-fought victory against Alvinczy.

Both sides were reinforced before Alvinczy launched another attack in January. Bonaparte defeated this renewed assault at the Battle of Rivoli, inflicting some 14,000 casualties. Then he surrounded and captured a second Austrian relief column near Mantua. Soon after, Mantua finally surrendered to the French, making it possible for the French to continue their advance eastwards towards Austria. After a brief campaign during which the Austrian army was commanded by the Emperor's brother, the Archduke Charles, the French advanced to within 100 miles of Vienna, and the Austrians sued for peace. Bonaparte's campaign, by threatening Vienna directly, was the trigger that led to Austria sending negotiators to Leoben to ask Bonaparte for peace with France. The peace treaty that resulted, the treaty of Campo Formio, also effectively ended the War of the First Coalition, as Austria was the main combatant remaining in continental Europe still fighting the French at that time. On 5 December 1797 Napoleon arrived in Paris.

== Campaigns in Central Italy (1797–1799) ==
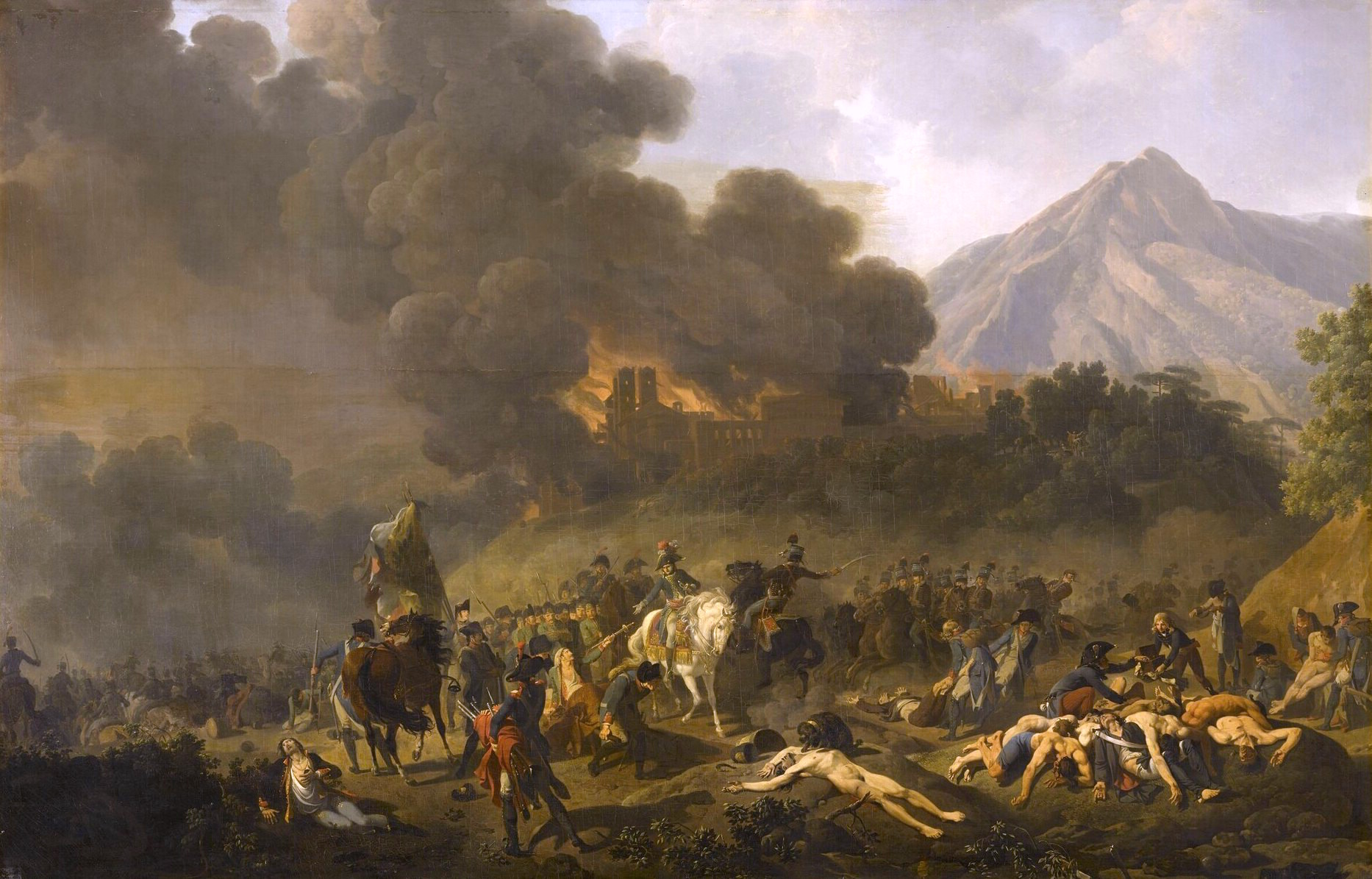
General Bonaparte during the Italian campaign in 1797.

Napoleon's invasion of Northern Italy caused disorder in the Papal States. Under the Treaty of Tolentino, Pope Pius VI was forced to cede the Romagna region to the newly founded Cispadane Republic, and recognize Joseph Bonaparte as the ambassador to Rome. Following the dissolution of the First Coalition, a Republican Revolt staged by General Bonaparte and Brigadier General Mathurin-Leonard Duphot led to the killing of Duphot at Joseph's palace by Papal State troops.

An apology was issued by the Pope on 29 December 1797, however it was rejected by the Republic soon after. Napoleon then declared war on the Papal States for a second time, sending 9,000 troops under General Louis-Alexandre Berthier to occupy Rome and dissolve the state.

Refusing to renounce his temporal authority, Pius VI was exiled from Rome, and later died in Valence, France. Napoleon officially dissolved the Papal States in February 1798, at which the Anconine Republic and the Tiberina Republic were recognized as sister republics. In Rome, Berthier declared the establishment of a Roman Republic, overthrowing the previous elective monarchy. However, shortly after, coalition forces intervened, causing internal struggles within the so-called "Roman Council", which lasted until the Neapolitan invasion in 1799. Governor Jacques Macdonald defended the city with a small army of 9,000 troops on 19 November, and the Battles of Ferentino, Otricoli, and Civita Castellana, together with an affair at Calvi Risorta and Capua pushed King Ferdinand IV into Castel Sant'Elmo, and led to the declaration of the Parthenopean Republic at Naples, incurring some 8,000 Neapolitan casualties and 1,000 French.

In April, Cardinal Fabrizio Ruffo marched into Calabria with an army of 17,000 soldiers and reinstated the Monarchy, initiating a siege of Naples in June. With British assistance, the Parthenopeans collapsed soon after. A Neapolitan invasion in September led to the dissolution of the Roman Republic which was subsequently replaced by the Papacy until the Napoleonic Wars.

== Second Coalition (1799–1801) ==
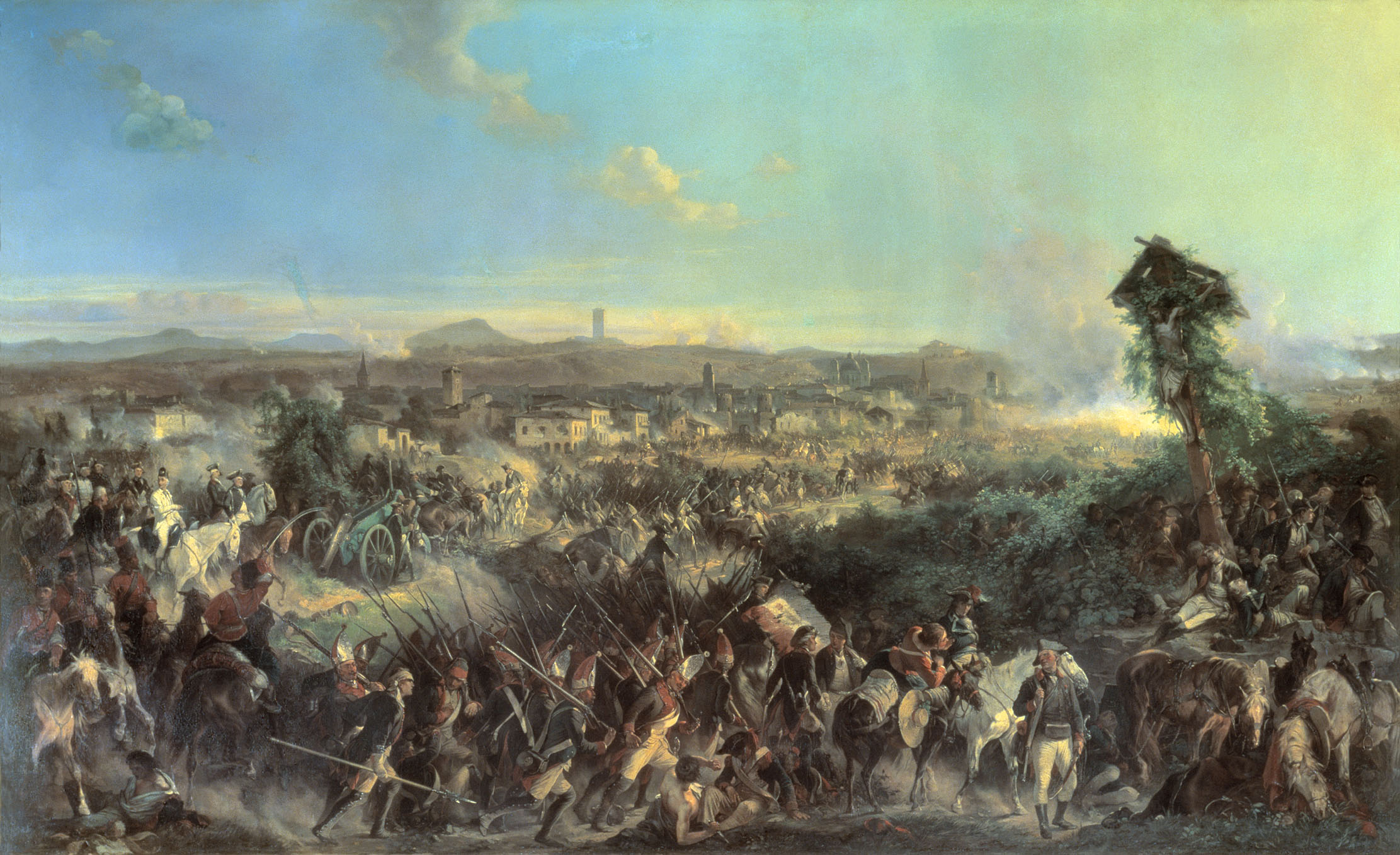
The Battle of Novi.

The second phase of the war in Italy began in 1799 as part of the War of the Second Coalition and was different from the first in that Russian forces participated in the campaign. However, at the beginning of the conflict the Russians were yet to arrive. Bonaparte, meanwhile, was away from the continent, as from May, 1798 to September, 1799 he was leading the Egyptian Campaign.

Some 60,000 French troops under Schérer faced off against an equal number of Austrians. An additional 50,000 Russians were expected to arrive shortly. The French were occupied with the pacification of Naples and this halved their effective strength to face the Austrians. In order to avoid a completely untenable situation arising, Schérer attacked as soon as possible in an attempt to preempt Austrian attacks.

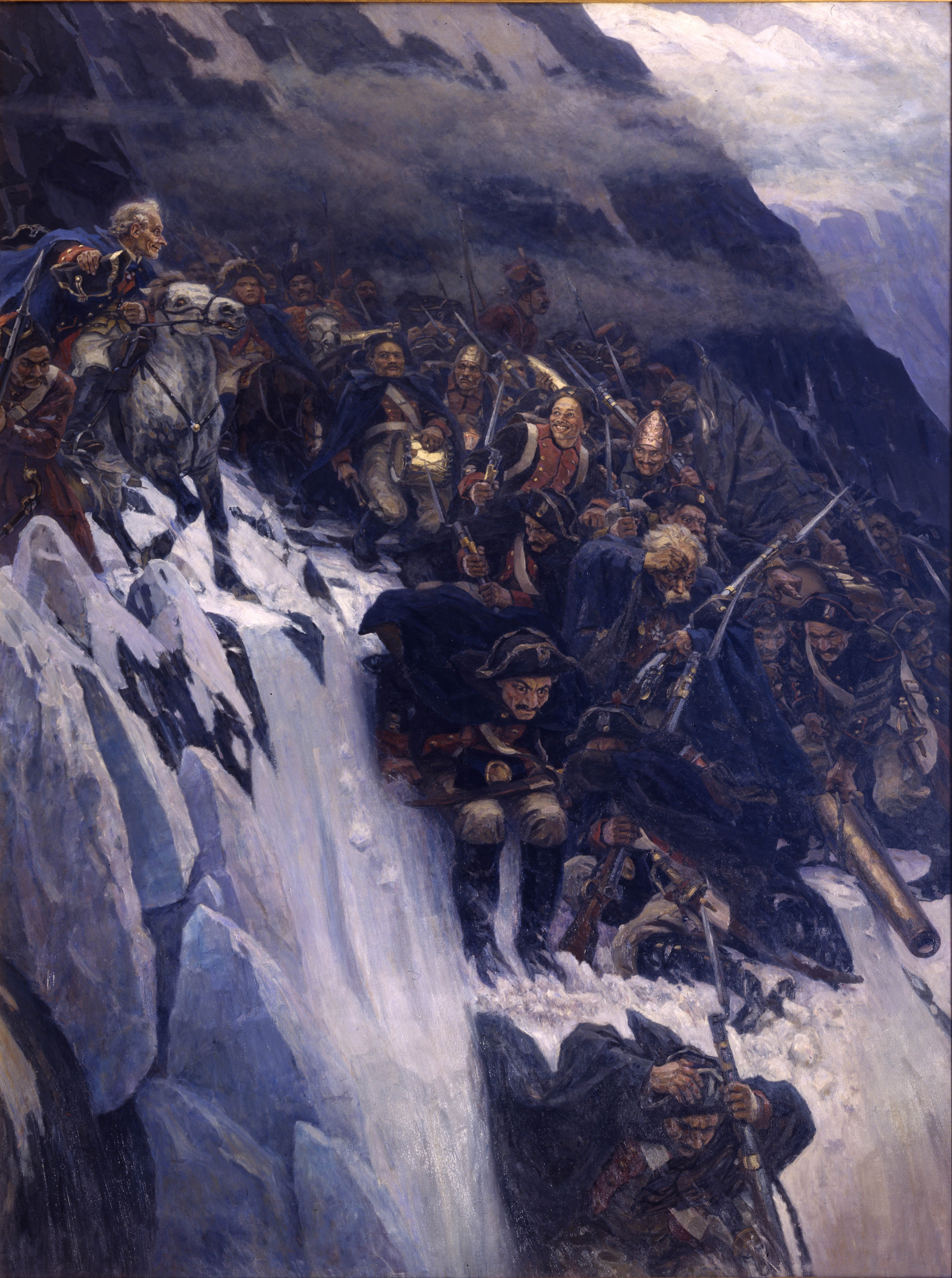
Suvorov crossing the Alps, by Vasily Surikov

Austrian commander Pál Kray defeated the French at Verona and Magnano in late March and early April. Schérer retreated back and left a small detachment of 8,000 in several forts. The Austrian commander, Michael von Melas, was slow to pursue the retreating French and was soon replaced as overall Coalition commander in the theatre by the brilliant Field Marshal Alexander Suvorov.

Schérer too was soon replaced by General Moreau, a man of greater fame and prestige. The French defeats at Lecco and Cassano on 26–28 April were followed by withdrawal from Lombardy and an overall unfavourable situation for the French. General Macdonald's army returned from Naples to support Moreau.

An initial Allied attack across the Po failed on 11 May. Moreau's army was in tatters with just 9,000 men remaining. An attempted counter-attack was beaten back by Russian General Petr Bagration. Suvorov soon occupied Turin and proclaimed the restoration of Piedmont to its king.

The Army of the Alps engaged the Austro-Russian forces in a series of minor skirmishes, but did not come to the rescue of the Army of Italy. Suvorov overran a number of French garrisons and continued his relentless advance. Macdonald engaged Suvorov in the Battle of the Trebbia and was crushed. Macdonald retreated with the remnant of his army to Genoa whilst Suvorov reached Novi. The Austrian high command ordered a halt to Allied offensives whilst the French garrisons of Mantua and Alessandria were overrun (see siege of Mantua and siege of Alessandria). Soon after this Moreau was dispatched to the Rhine and Joubert was sent to command the Army of Italy.

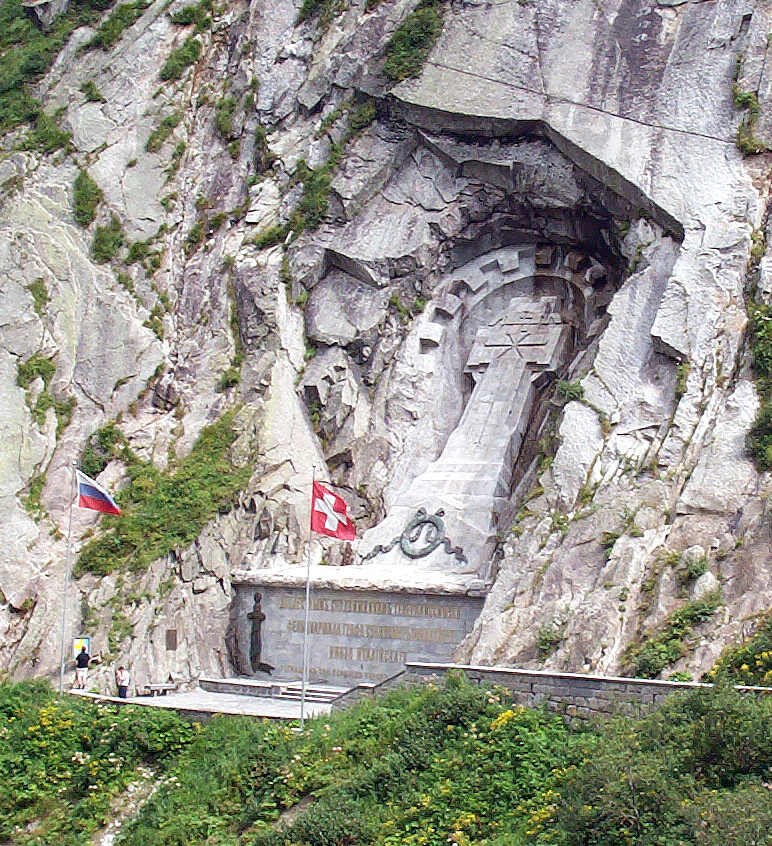
Suvorov monument in the Swiss Alps.

Suvorov, acting under orders from the Coalition high command, paused to gather his strength for an offensive in autumn. On 9 August, the French launched offensive of 38,000 men called the Battle of Novi. The offensive was thoroughly defeated by Suvorov, and resulted in the death of Joubert. Moreau, who had yet to depart for the Rhine, seized the initiative and led the survivors back to Genoa and began preparing a defence of the city.

However, at that time the Allied high command in Vienna ordered Suvorov to move out of Italy and concentrate on breaking through the Swiss front. The respite thus given the reeling Army of Italy led to a turning point in the war. Melas, who resumed command of Coalition forces in Italy, now almost exclusively Austrian, paused the offensive and consolidated his forces, now that the Russians had been removed from Italy.

By the spring of 1800, Russia had withdrawn entirely from the Coalition. The situation in Italy, however, was still very much on the side of the Coalition. Melas had some 100,000 men under his command, opposed by just 50,000 French troops who were thoroughly dispersed. The Allies prepared for a thrust into southern France and across the Rhine, much further north. Melas moved forward slowly, laying siege to Genoa and halting his advance elsewhere.

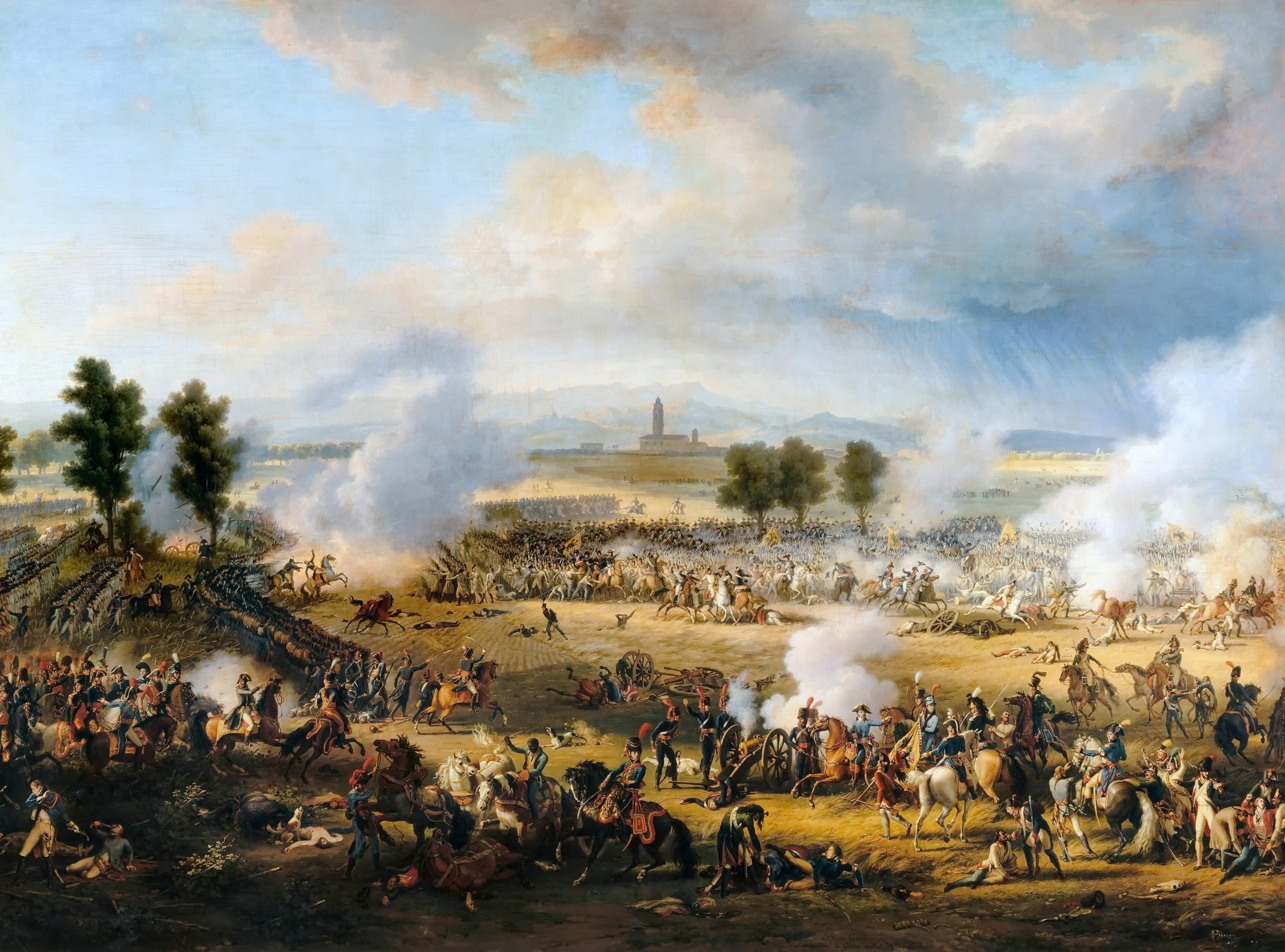
The Battle of Marengo by Louis-François Lejeune, 1801

It was at this time that the First Consul of France, Napoleon Bonaparte (who had seized French power in the Brumaire Coup of 9 November 1799), led his Reserve Army through the Great St Bernard pass with the aim of relieving Masséna in the Siege of Genoa, who was threatened by severe food shortages resulting from the combination of encirclement on land and naval blockade by the British.

Genoa fell before the First Consul could reach it. He concentrated his army and struck at the Austrians in an attempt to beat them before they too concentrated their forces again. The Reserve Army fought a battle at Montebello on 9 June before the main confrontation at Marengo. The consul was almost defeated here until General Desaix made a timely arrival with reinforcements and drove back Melas, thus turning a French rout into a French victory. In this counter-attack Desaix was killed, but Bonaparte later honoured him with monuments commemorating his bravery and his name has the place of honour on the face of the Arc de Triomphe, which was erected to celebrate Napoleon's victories.

Immediately after their victory at Marengo, the French pressured Austrian General Melas to sign an armistice (Convention of Alessandria) which led to the evacuation of northwestern Italy west of the Ticino River and the suspension of all Austrian military operations in Italy.

Austria and its ally Great Britain then sought to negotiate a join peace treaty with France, but Napoleon insisted on separate treaties with each nation and the negotiations failed to come to fruition. As a result, conflict with Austria and Great Britain resumed in late 1800.

On 3 December, a French army under the command of Jean Moreau crushed the Austrians at the Battle of Hohenlinden in Germany. Later that month on 25–6 December, a French army under the command of Guillaume Brune defeated the Austrians at the Battle of Pozzolo on the Mincio River in northern Italy. Brune then continued to press the Austrian forces and eventually pushed them back to Treviso in Veneto.

=== Armistice of Treviso ===
In Treviso on 16 January 1801, a ceasefire (Armistice of Treviso) was signed between the French and the Austrians. Under the terms, Austria agreed to surrender multiple strongholds in northern Italy including Peschiera, Verona, Legnago, Ancona and Ferrara. Ultimately, a peace treaty (Treaty of Lunéville) was negotiated in Paris. The final terms of the peace treaty included the surrender of the critical Austrian fortress at Mantua along with the recognition of the sovereignty and independence of the French client republics of Cisalpine, Ligurian, Batavian and Helvetic. In addition, the Grand Duchy of Tuscany was ceded to France. Those Italian princes who lost territory, including the Grand Duke of Tuscany and the Duke of Modena, were to be compensated with territory in Germany east of the Rhine.

In return, the Austrian territorial acquisitions stipulated in the Treaty of Campo Formio in 1797 including the Venetian Terraferma, Venetian Dalmatia and all of Istria were confirmed.

By means of the Treaty of Lunéville, Austria finally withdrew from the War of the Second Coalition and ended the war in northern Italy. This left only the British to continue the war until they themselves concluded peace in March 1802 with the Treaty of Amiens.

== Bibliography ==
- Clausewitz, Carl von (2018). Napoleon's 1796 Italian Campaign. Trans and ed. Nicholas Murray and Christopher Pringle. Lawrence, Kansas: University Press of Kansas. ISBN 978-0-7006-2676-2
- Clausewitz, Carl von (2020). Napoleon Absent, Coalition Ascendant: The 1799 Campaign in Italy and Switzerland, Volume 1. Trans and ed. Nicholas Murray and Christopher Pringle. Lawrence, Kansas: University Press of Kansas. ISBN 978-0-7006-3025-7
- Clausewitz, Carl von (2021). The Coalition Crumbles, Napoleon Returns: The 1799 Campaign in Italy and Switzerland, Volume 2. Trans and ed. Nicholas Murray and Christopher Pringle. Lawrence, Kansas: University Press of Kansas. ISBN 978-0-7006-3034-9
- McLynn, Frank (1998). Napoleon. Pimlico. ISBN 0-7126-6247-2.
