= Der Antritt des neuen Jahrhunderts =

"The Start of the New Century" ("Der Antritt des neuen Jahrhunderts") is a poem written by Friedrich Schiller early in the 19th century, possibly in 1801. It deals with the Peace of Lunéville and the Napoleonic Wars.

== Sources ==
- Jochen Golz (ed.), Schiller. Sämtliche Werke, Berliner Ausgabe, Vol. I, Gedichte, Aufbau-Verlag, Berlin 1980, S. 497 f.
