= Monzambano =

Administrative division of Lombardy, Italy

Monzambano Mosambà (Emilian)
- Comune
- Comune di Monzambano
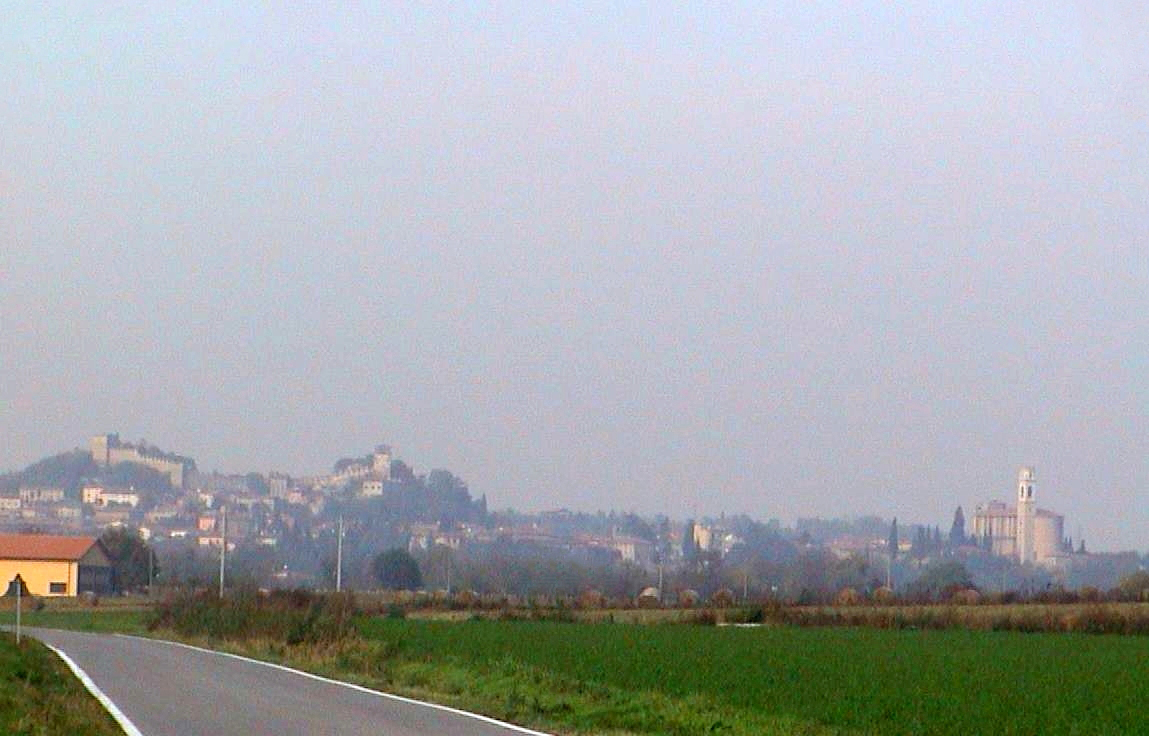

- Coat of arms

- Location within Italy Location within Lombardy
- Coordinates: 45°23′N 10°42′E
- Country: Italy
- Region: Lombardy
- Province: Mantua (MN)
- Frazioni: Castellaro Lagusello, Pille, Olfino

Government
  - Mayor: Giorgio Cappa

Area
  - Total: 29.9 km^{2} (11.5 sq mi)
- Elevation: 88 m (289 ft)

Population (28 February 2017)
  - Total: 4,835
  - Density: 162/km^{2} (419/sq mi)
- Demonym: Monzambanesi
- Time zone: UTC+1 (CET)
  - Summer (DST): UTC+2 (CEST)
- Postal code: 46040
- Dialing code: 0376
- Patron saint: St. Bartholomew
- Website: Official website

Monzambano (Upper Mantovano: Mosambà) is a comune (municipality) in the Province of Mantua in the Italian region Lombardy, located about 120 kilometres (75 mi) east of Milan and about 25 kilometres (16 mi) northwest of Mantua. Its frazione of Castellaro Lagusello is one of I Borghi più belli d'Italia ("The most beautiful villages of Italy").

== World Heritage Site ==
It is home to one or more prehistoric pile-dwelling (or stilt house) settlements that are part of the Prehistoric Pile dwellings around the Alps UNESCO World Heritage Site.
