= Heinrich von Bellegarde =

Savoyard Nobleman and Habsburg Military Commander

Count Heinrich von Bellegarde
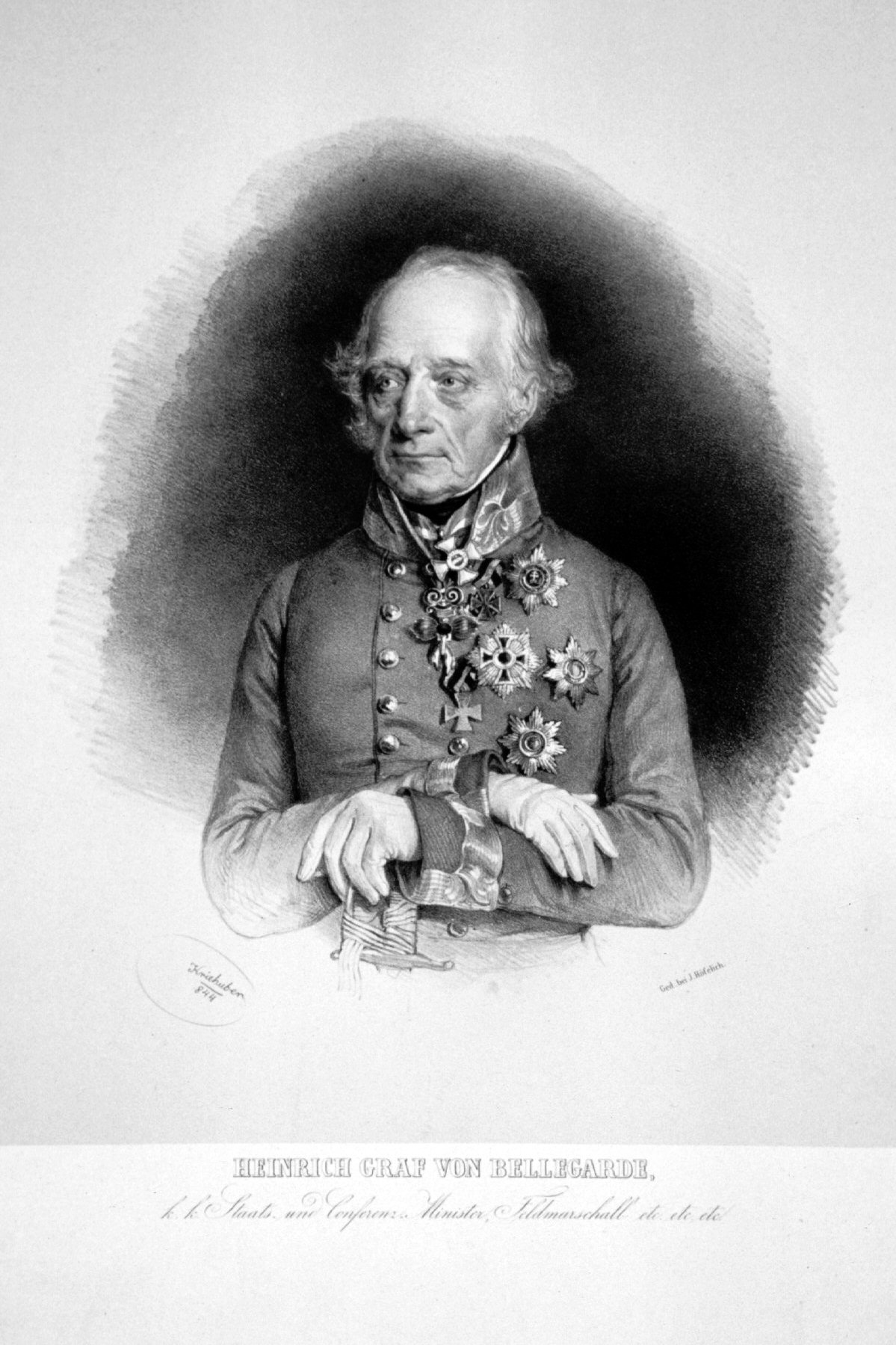
- Count Heinrich von Bellegarde, Lithography by Josef Kriehuber, 1844
- Born: 29 August 1756; Dresden, Electorate of Saxony, Holy Roman Empire
- Died: 22 July 1845 (aged 88); Vienna, Austrian Empire
- Spouse: Augusta von Berlichingen
- Military career
- Allegiance: Electorate of Saxony; Habsburg monarchy Austrian Empire
- Rank: Feldmarschall
- Conflicts: War of the Bavarian Succession; Austro-Turkish War (1788–1791); French Revolutionary Wars; Second Battle of Marengo; Battle of Novi; Siege of Alessandria (1799); Battle of Pozzolo; Napoleonic Wars; Battle of Caldiero; Battle of Aspern-Essling; Battle of Wagram; Battle of Mincio River
- Awards: Military Order of Maria Theresa
- Other work: Delegate, congress of Rastatt; Governor-general of Galicia; Viceroy of Lombardy-Venetia; Member (Presiding), Aulic Council

Count Heinrich von Bellegarde, Viceroy of Lombardy-Venetia (German: Heinrich Joseph Johannes, Graf von Bellegarde or sometimes Heinrich von Bellegarde; 29 August 1756 – 22 July 1845), of a noble Savoyard family, was born in Saxony, joined the Saxon army and later entered Habsburg military service, where he became a general officer serving in the Habsburg border wars, the French Revolutionary Wars and the Napoleonic Wars. He became a Generalfeldmarschall and statesman.

== Early career ==
Born in Dresden in the Electorate of Saxony on 29 August 1756, his family stemmed from the Bellegarde family, an old line of Savoyards. His father was the Saxon General Johann Franz von Bellegarde (1707-1769) (awarded with the title of Count in 1741) and his mother was Countess Maria Antonia von Hartig (b. 1719). Bellegarde first served in the Saxon army, receiving a commission as a Fähnrich (ensign) in the Infantry Regiment Bork; later as a lieutenant in the Queen's regiment. Transferring his services to Austria in 1771, Bellegarde and distinguished himself leading the dragoon regiment Zweibrück in the War of the Bavarian Succession. In 1781, Joseph II named him major of the Savoy dragoons, and four years later he was colonel of the Dragoon Regiment Berlichingen.

At Batajnica (in German sources called Bexania), a village on the outskirts of Belgrade, at 09:00 on 9 September 1788, Bellegarde engaged in his first feat of arms (the War of Bavarian Succession had no battles): with four squadron of his regiment, he led an attack against the Ottomans entrenched in a line between Batajnica and Semlin; and in the enthusiasm of the attack brought with him a squadron of the Division Zeschwitz Cuirassiers, the Joseph Toscana Dragoons, part of a division of Zelschwit cuirassiers and a squadron of Wurmser Hussars, securing control of a dam and earthenworks on a Danube tributary.

By the end of fighting, in which Bellegarde played a pivotal role in leading the Wurmser Hussars to secure control of the earth works, the Ottoman force lost 300 men, and the Austrians lost 31, and 42 wounded. In the course of the following year, Bellegarde, with his dragoons, came under the command of General of Cavalry Count Kinsky. The largest part of the campaign, he remained with his regiment in cantonment, in the Banat, but as part of the force upon which Feldmarshal Laudon could draw. In late summer 1792, the Regiment Archduke Joseph Toscana dragoons transferred to the Netherlands.

== Wars of the First and Second Coalition ==
After being appointed a General-Major in at the end of 1792, he fought in the War of the First Coalition in the Netherlands campaigns of 1793–1794, attached to the command of Feldzeugmeister Prince Hohenlohe, in the main headquarters of Trier. He commanded a defensive line between the Mosel and the Saar rivers, in the Eifel and at the border of the Liège; on his right stood Feldmarshal Lieutenant Beaulieu, and on his left, the Prussian general Kohler. He commanded three battalions, two light companies and two squadrons of hussars.

His contribution to the siege force at Le Quesnoy included two battalions of infantry regiment Grand Duke of Tuscany (Nr 23), a battalion of the Sinoth grenadiers, and two battalions of the Wartensleben. The French made several attempts to lift the siege. On 17 August 1793, he was in the nearby forest with his command, and led a bayonette charge against 6,000 French positioned in the trees, chased them out, and occupied the wood. preventing these troops from relieving the besieged fortress. At the Battle of Avesnes-le-Sec on 12 September, cavalry under his command overran another French relief force in a "highly effective cavalry action".

After winning promotion to Feldmarshal-Leutnant, he served on the staff of the Archduke Charles in the fighting in Germany. He accompanied Charles to Italy in the following year. He was also employed in the congress of Rastatt.

In 1799, Bellegarde commanded a corps in eastern Switzerland, connecting the armies of Archduke Charles and Aleksandr Suvorov, and finally joined the latter in north Italy. He conducted the siege of the citadel of Alessandria, and was present at the decisive Battle of Novi. After the Austrian defeat at the Battle of Marengo (in which his brother Friedrich Bellegarde commanded a brigade), Emperor Francis II of Austria appointed Bellegarde to command the army in Italy with the rank of General of Cavalry. On 25 December, the French defeated Bellegarde at the Battle of Pozzolo.

== Napoleonic Wars ==
In 1805, when Archduke Charles left to take command in Italy, Bellegarde became president ad interim of the council of war. He was, however, soon employed in the field, and at the sanguinary Battle of Caldiero he commanded the Austrian right.

In the War of the Fifth Coalition he commanded the I Armee Korps. He supervised the II Armee Korps, which was also posted on the north bank of the Danube River. Cut off from Archduke Charles as the result of the Battle of Eckmühl, he retreated into Bohemia, but managed to rejoin the main army before the great battles near Vienna.

He led the I Korps in the battles of Aspern-Essling and Wagram. After the 1809 war, Bellegarde became a Feldmarschall. From 1809 to 1813 he was governor-general of Galicia, but was often called to preside over the meetings of the Aulic Council, especially in 1810 in connection with the reorganization of the Austrian army.

In 1813, 1814 and 1815 he led the Austrian armies in Italy. His successes in these campaigns were diplomatic as well as military, and he ended them by crushing the last attempt of Joachim Murat to regain the Kingdom of Naples in 1815.

Between 1815 and 1816, he was Viceroy of Lombardy-Venetia. From 1816 to 1825, (when he had to retire owing to failing eyesight) he held various distinguished civil and military posts.

== Family ==
Early in 1791 in Vienna, he married Baroness Augusta von Berlichingen (1765-1831), the widow of the Baron Friedrich August von Berlichingen (d. 1788), and the daughter of Baron Friedrich Alexander von Berlichingen (1719-1789) and his wife, Countess Anna Katalin Forgách de Ghymes et Gacs (b. 1728). They had two sons and a daughter:

- Countess Adelheid von Bellegarde, married in 1810 to Nicolas René de Vincent, Baron de Vincent (1788-1868) and had issue
- Count August von Bellegarde (29. October 1795; † 21. June 1873), married Baroness Julie von Gudenus (28. October 1795; † 11. February 1865) and had issue
- Count Heinrich von Bellegarde (1798; † 17. June 1871), married Countess Pauline von Wolkenstein-Trostburg (6. May 1805) and had issue

== Death ==
Heinrich died in Vienna on 22 July 1845, aged 88. He was buried in Vienna Central Cemetery, Austria.

== Sources ==
- Clausewitz, Carl von (2020). Napoleon Absent, Coalition Ascendant: The 1799 Campaign in Italy and Switzerland, Volume 1. Trans and ed. Nicholas Murray and Christopher Pringle. Lawrence, Kansas: University Press of Kansas. ISBN 978-0-7006-3025-7
- Clausewitz, Carl von (2021). The Coalition Crumbles, Napoleon Returns: The 1799 Campaign in Italy and Switzerland, Volume 2. Trans and ed. Nicholas Murray and Christopher Pringle. Lawrence, Kansas: University Press of Kansas. ISBN 978-0-7006-3034-9
- (in German) Hirtenfeld, J. Der Militar-Maria-Theresien Orden und seine Mitgleider, vol. 2, Aus der Kaiserlich-königlichen Hof- und Staatsdruckerei, 1857.
- Smith, Digby. The Napoleonic Wars Data Book. London: Greenhill, 1998. ISBN 1-85367-276-9
- (in German) Smola, Das Leben des Feldmarschalls Heinrich Graf von Bellegarde (Vienna, 1847).
