= Second Congress of Rastatt =

Territorial settlement between Revolutionary France and the Holy Roman Empire (1797–99)

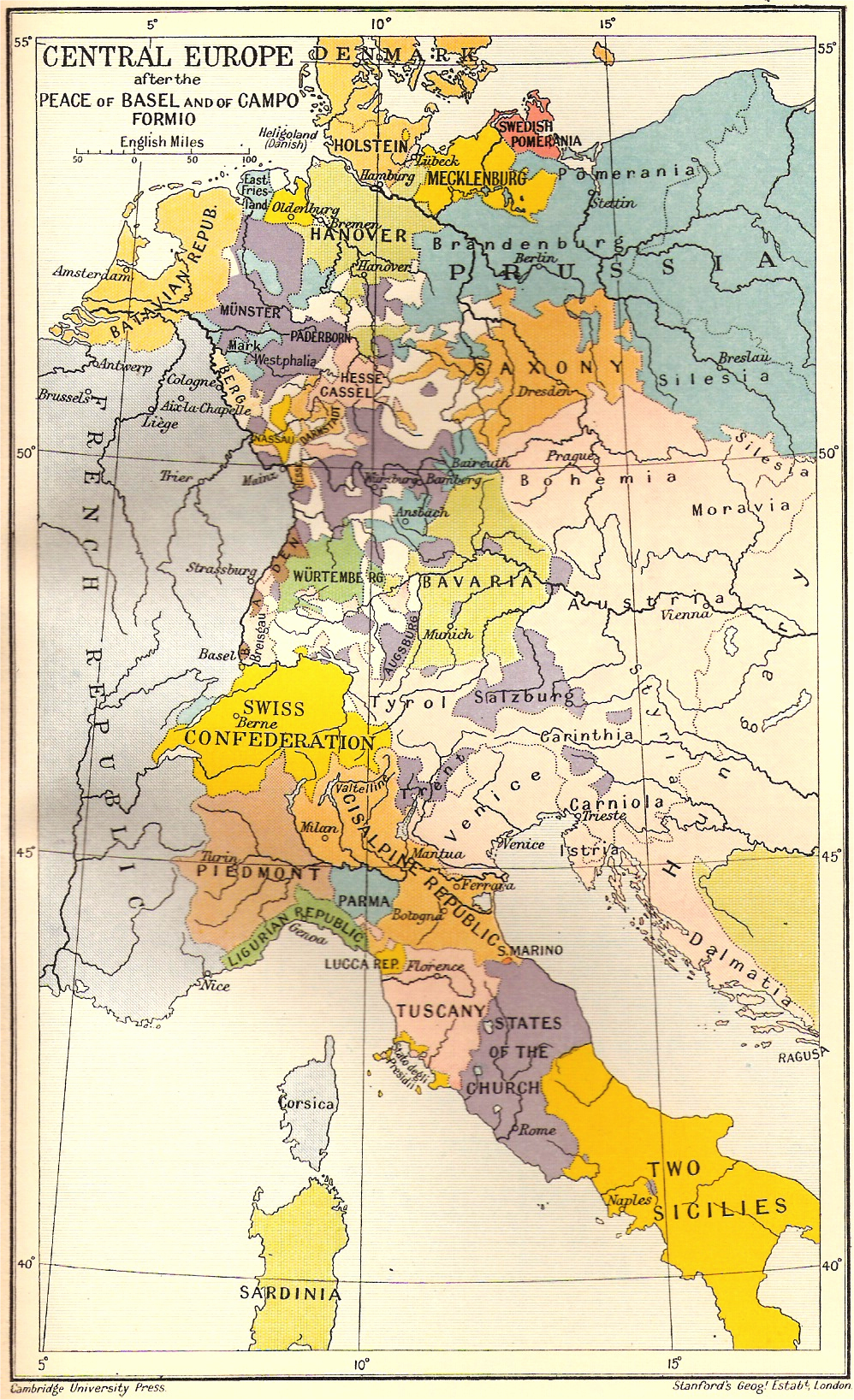
- Map shows Central Europe 1797
- Context: Failed congress to compensate the German princes dispossessed by the War of the First Coalition.
- Drafted: 1797–1799
- Location: Rastatt
- Parties: (France) French First Republic; (Habsburg monarchy) Holy Roman Empire

The Second Congress of Rastatt, which began its deliberations in November 1797, was intended to negotiate a general peace between the French Republic and the Holy Roman Empire, as well as to draw up a compensation plan to compensate those princes whose lands on the left bank of the Rhine had been seized by France in the War of the First Coalition. Facing the French delegation was a 10-member Imperial delegation made up of delegates from the electorates of Mainz, Saxony, Bavaria, Hanover, as well as the secular territories of Austria, Baden, Hesse-Darmstadt, the Prince-Bishopric of Würzburg, and the imperial cities of Augsburg and Frankfurt. The congress was interrupted when Austria and Russia resumed war against France in March 1799 at the start of the War of the Second Coalition, thus rendering the proceedings moot. Furthermore, as the French delegates attempted to return home, they were attacked by Austrian cavalrymen or possibly French royalists masquerading as such. Two diplomats were killed and a third seriously injured. The congress was held at Rastatt near Karlsruhe.

== Rastatt ==
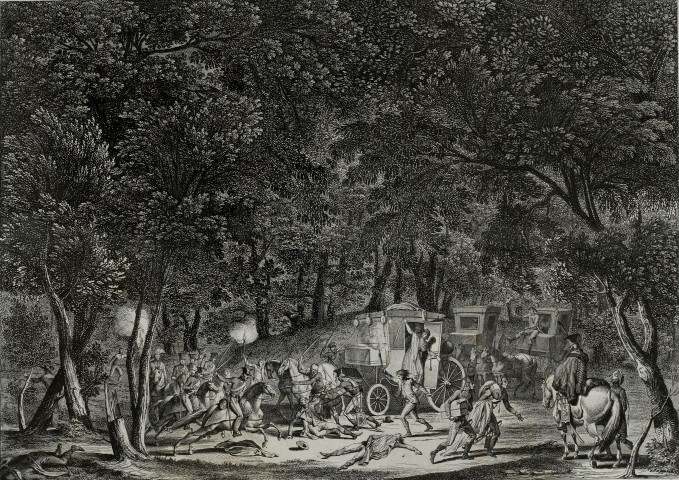
The French plenipotentiaries assaulted near Rastatt (Musée de la Révolution française).

Widespread disagreement among the German delegates precluded the drawing up of a compensation plan but two important results were nevertheless achieved during the first months of the congress: the official recognition of the loss of the entire left bank to France, and the recognition that any compensation plan should be based on the secularization of the ecclesiastical states of the Empire. It is on this basis that deliberations on a compensation plan would resume after the signing of the Treaty of Lunéville in February 1801.

As the three French representatives were leaving the town in April 1799 they were waylaid by a group of Hungarian hussars. Two of them were assassinated, while Jean Debry received thirteen sabre slashes but escaped. The origin of this outrage remains shrouded in mystery, but the balance of evidence seems to show that the Austrian authorities had commanded their men to seize the papers of the French plenipotentiaries in order to avoid damaging disclosures about Austria's designs on Bavaria, and that the soldiers had exceeded their instructions. On the other hand, some authorities think that the deed was the work of French Émigrés, or of the party in France in favour of war.

Since it was expected that a major territorial reorganization of the Empire would result from the congress, it was followed with considerable interest, even passion, throughout Germany. Although indecisive from a diplomatic point of view the Congress brought high society to the area of Baden and was responsible for resurgence of interest in the spa town of Baden-Baden.

== See also ==
- Internationalization of the Danube River
