= Treaty of Lunéville =

1801 Treaty during the War of the Second Coalition

Treaty of Peace between France and the Emperor of Germany
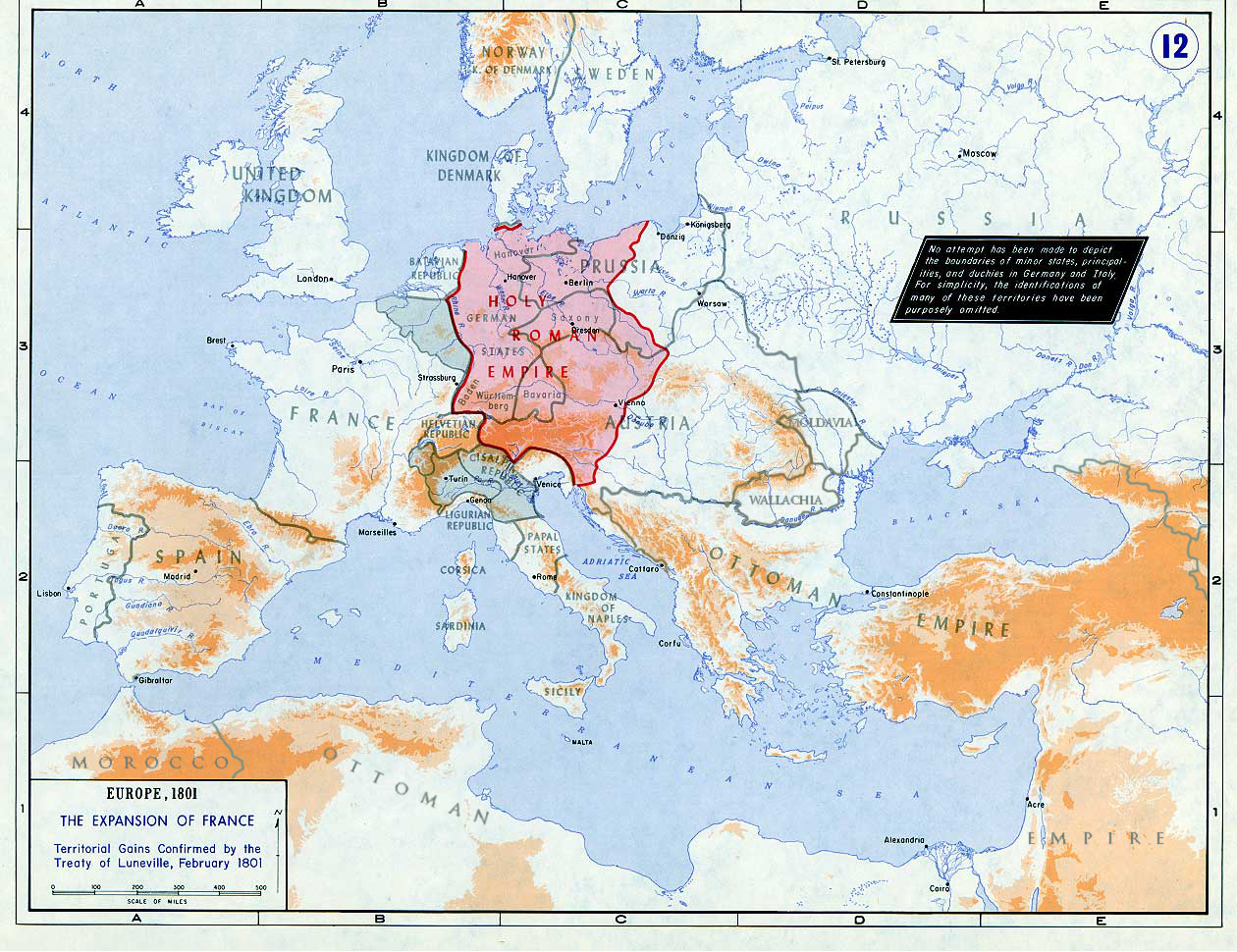
- Europe after Lunéville
- Type: Peace treaty
- Context: War of the Second Coalition
- Signed: 9 February 1801
- Location: Lunéville, France
- Signatories: First French Republic; Holy Roman Empire

The Treaty of Lunéville (or Peace of Lunéville) was signed in the Treaty House of Lunéville on 9 February 1801. The signatory parties were the French Republic and Emperor Francis II, who signed on his own behalf as ruler of the hereditary domains of the House of Austria and on behalf of the Holy Roman Empire. The signatories were Joseph Bonaparte and Count Ludwig von Cobenzl, the Austrian foreign minister. The treaty formally ended Austrian and Imperial participation in the War of the Second Coalition and the French Revolutionary Wars, as well as the Imperial Kingdom of Italy.

The Austrian army had been defeated by Napoleon Bonaparte at the Battle of Marengo on 14 June 1800 and then by Jean Victor Moreau at the Battle of Hohenlinden on 3 December. Forced to sue for peace, the Austrians signed the Treaty of Lunéville, which largely confirmed the Treaty of Campo Formio (17 October 1797), which itself had confirmed the Peace of Leoben (18 April 1797). The United Kingdom was the sole nation still at war with France for another year.

The Austrians would resume war against France in 1805.

== Negotiations ==
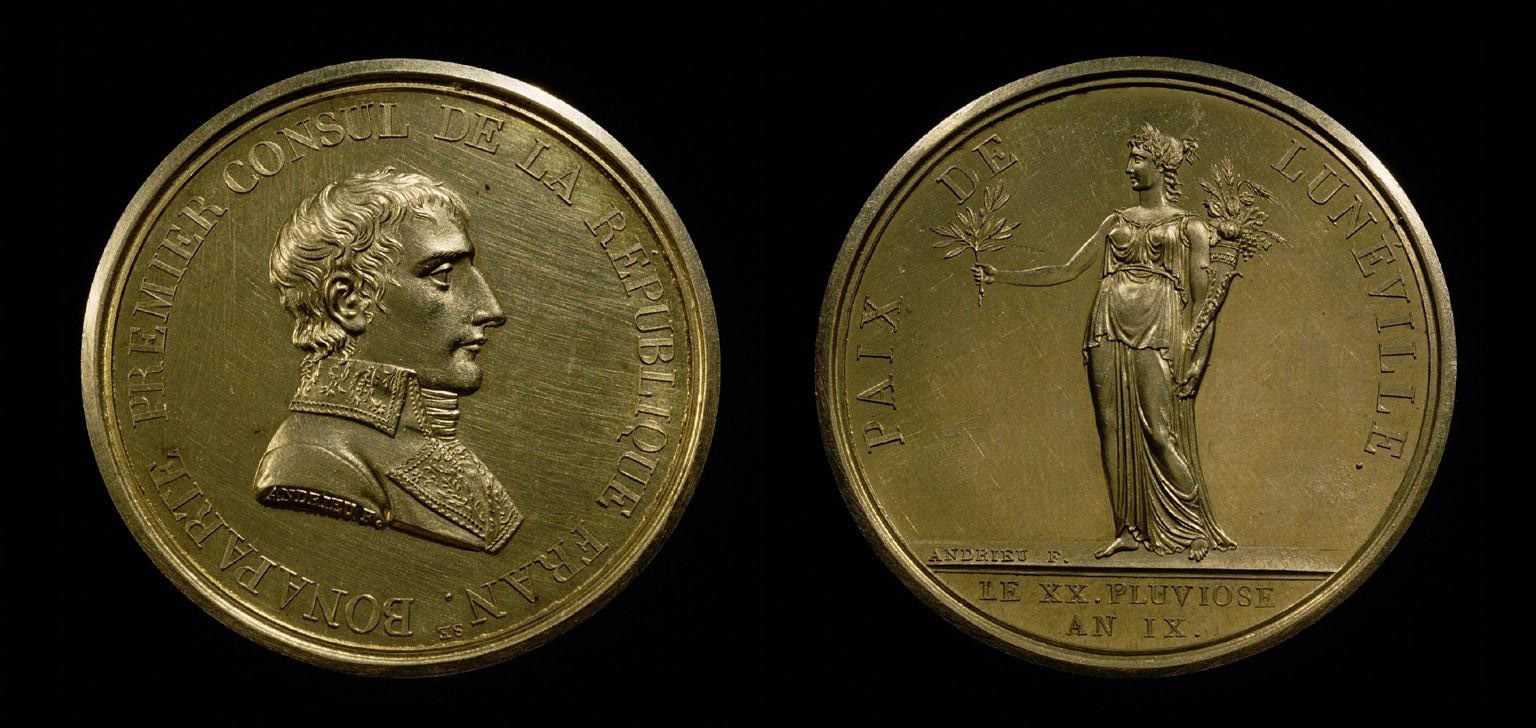
Medallion honouring Napoleon and the Treaty of Lunéville

On 25 December 1799, Bonaparte wrote to Francis II to propose peace. The imperial response was delayed. On 20 January 1800, Austria and Britain signed a convention of alliance against France. On 25 January, Austria responded negatively to Bonaparte's offer. When Bonaparte renewed his offer after Marengo, however, the Austrian response was positive. A series of three negotiations followed.

Two armistices preceded the opening of negotiations: the Convention of Alessandria (15 June 1800) in Italy and the Armistice of Parsdorf (15 July) in Germany.

=== First round ===
Count Joseph von Saint-Julien (Note: The brother of Franz Xaver von Saint-Julien, Joseph delivered Napoleon's letter renewing his peace offer in June.) arrived in Paris on 21 July 1800 and was received with enthusiasm. He met with French Foreign Minister Charles Maurice de Talleyrand-Périgord on 22–24 and 27 July. On 28 July, both signed a preliminary peace, which was mostly a copy of the Treaty of Campo Formio. The main difference was that the House of Austria was to be indemnified for its losses with territory in Italy, rather than in Germany. On 30 July, Saint-Julien left for Vienna accompanied by a French plenipotentiary, Géraud Duroc, although the French had intended for the final treaty to be signed in Paris.

Duroc was not allowed to cross the Austrian lines. Saint-Julian arrived in Vienna on 5 August, but his preliminary peace was rejected by the emperor. On 13 August, Duroc was denied a passport and given a letter from Austrian Foreign Minister Johann Amadeus von Thugut, the architect of the Anglo-Austrian alliance, to Talleyrand. Duroc returned to Paris on 20 August. It is thought that his report on the state of the Austrian forces, based on his stay at General Paul Kray's headquarters, influenced Napoleon's decision to launch a new offensive in September.

Shortly after Duroc had delivered the Austrian response, Saint-Julien was imprisoned and accused of signing a treaty without authorisation.

=== Second round ===
After the Saint-Julien fiasco, Thugut expressed a desire for Austria and Britain to negotiate together, but Napoleon rejected the idea of a peace conference. Britain, in turn, rejected French proposals for a separate peace. On 7 September, British Foreign Minister, Lord Grenville dispatched a counterproject to Paris, which contained a proposed naval armistice. The offer was received on 10 September, and Napoleon extended the armistice one week to consider the proposal, which was rejected. As a result, by the Convention of Hohenlinden of 20 September 1800, Austria ceded the fortresses of Ulm, Philippsburg and Ingolstadt to France in exchange for a one-month extension to the armistice. On 25 September, Thugut resigned as Austrian foreign minister.

=== Final round ===
The emperor originally nominated Ludwig Conrad von Lehrbach as his plenipotentiary for the peace talks in Lunéville. As Lehrbach had signed the Convention of Hohenlinden and caused Thugut's fall, he was unacceptable to the British. He was replaced by Ludwig von Cobenzl, who was not initially authorised to negotiate apart from the British. The final round of negotiations thus began with a long period during which France and Austria haggled over the terms of negotiating while the armistices lapsed in late November.

The peace conference was supposed to open in Lunéville on 7 October, but Cobenzl did not arrive for over two weeks, and Lord Grenville never appeared. By 25 October, Cobenzl, without instructions, had gone from Lunéville to Paris. He left a week later, the French having failed to separate him from his British allies. Cobenzl returned for a meeting with Napoleon before his first negotiation at Lunéville on 9 November with Joseph Bonaparte. Since Cobenzl was not authorised to treat for a separate peace, and Joseph was authorised only to treat with Austria, the negotiations began at a deadlock. Joseph proposed that a secret treaty could be negotiated, with the British being invited to a public conference for appearance's sake only after negotiations had been effectively complete and the treaty publicly signed and all earlier copies burnt, only in March 1801, after the expiration of the Anglo-Austrian alliance. The British, meanwhile, had by 23 November suspended payment of the second installment of the subsidy that they had agreed to pay Austria on 20 June.

During the negotiations at Lunéville, the French actively sought the alliance of Russia. After a rapprochement had been made, Napoleon withdrew the offer to admit a British representative under any circumstances on 7 December. On 3 December, the French had won their victory at Hohenlinden. New instructions reached Cobenzl on 26 December. He was authorised to sign a preliminary separate peace to obtain a general armistice. In fact, an armistice covering Germany had already been signed by the commanders in the field on 25 December. On 26 December, the Second League of Armed Neutrality was formed. On 27 December, Francis II informed King George III of the United Kingdom of being unable to meet his obligations as an ally. On 31 December, Cobenzl informed the French that he would negotiate without Britain.

The final negotiations concerned mainly boundaries and indemnities in Italy. The Grand Duchy of Tuscany was a major issue. The terms of Campo Formio were accepted by Austria for Germany, and only the nature and the methods of compensation for imperial princes losing territory had to be decided. As of 30 December, the emperor was offering to accept the Oglio (rather than the Adda) as the boundary of his territory in Italy if he held onto the Legations, and the Duke of Modena was indemnified for his losses in Italy, not Germany. Since the fighting continued in Italy while negotiations were underway at Lunéville, Cobenzl was forced to adjust his demands successively eastward as the French advanced in Italy. By 5 January, he was willing to accept the Chiese, by 9 January the Mincio and by 15 January the Adige and the Fossa Maestra.

On 16 January, the Austrian and French commanders in Italy concluded the Armistice of Treviso, which left the fortress of Mantua in Austrian hands. Cobenzl was not aware of that at the time of his sixth official conference with Joseph on 25 January. France demanded the cession of the fortresses of Mantua, Peschiera, Legnano, Ferrara and Ancona and the expulsion of the Grand Duke of Tuscany from Italy in return for an armistice in Italy. Since the Armistice of Steyr was expiring, both sides agreed to extend it as well. As a result, Mantua was lost to Austria.

On 1 February, France accepted an Austrian request to allow a representative of Naples and Sicily to take part in the negotiations although that did not happen. The final week was taken up by the issue of the Left Bank of the Rhine and the Empire. Austria wanted another congress like the Congress of Rastatt to make peace for the Empire. Napoleon demanded that Francis sign on behalf of himself, his own territories and the Holy Roman Empire. The treaty was finally signed at 5:00 in the evening on 9 February 1801.

== Terms ==
The Treaty of Lunéville declared that "there shall be, henceforth and forever, peace, amity, and good understanding" among the parties. The treaty required Austria to enforce the conditions of the earlier Treaty of Campo Formio.

The independence and sovereignty of the Cisalpine, Ligurian, Batavian and Helvetic republics was recognized. The entire left bank of the Rhine, including the Austrian Netherlands, was ceded to France. Imperial Italy was also ceded by the Empire, becoming parts of France and the new Italian Republic.

Whereas Campo Formio had not affected the Grand Duchy of Tuscany, Lunéville ceded it to France. In another change from Campo Formio, certain imperial fortresses on the right bank of the Rhine were to be demolished.

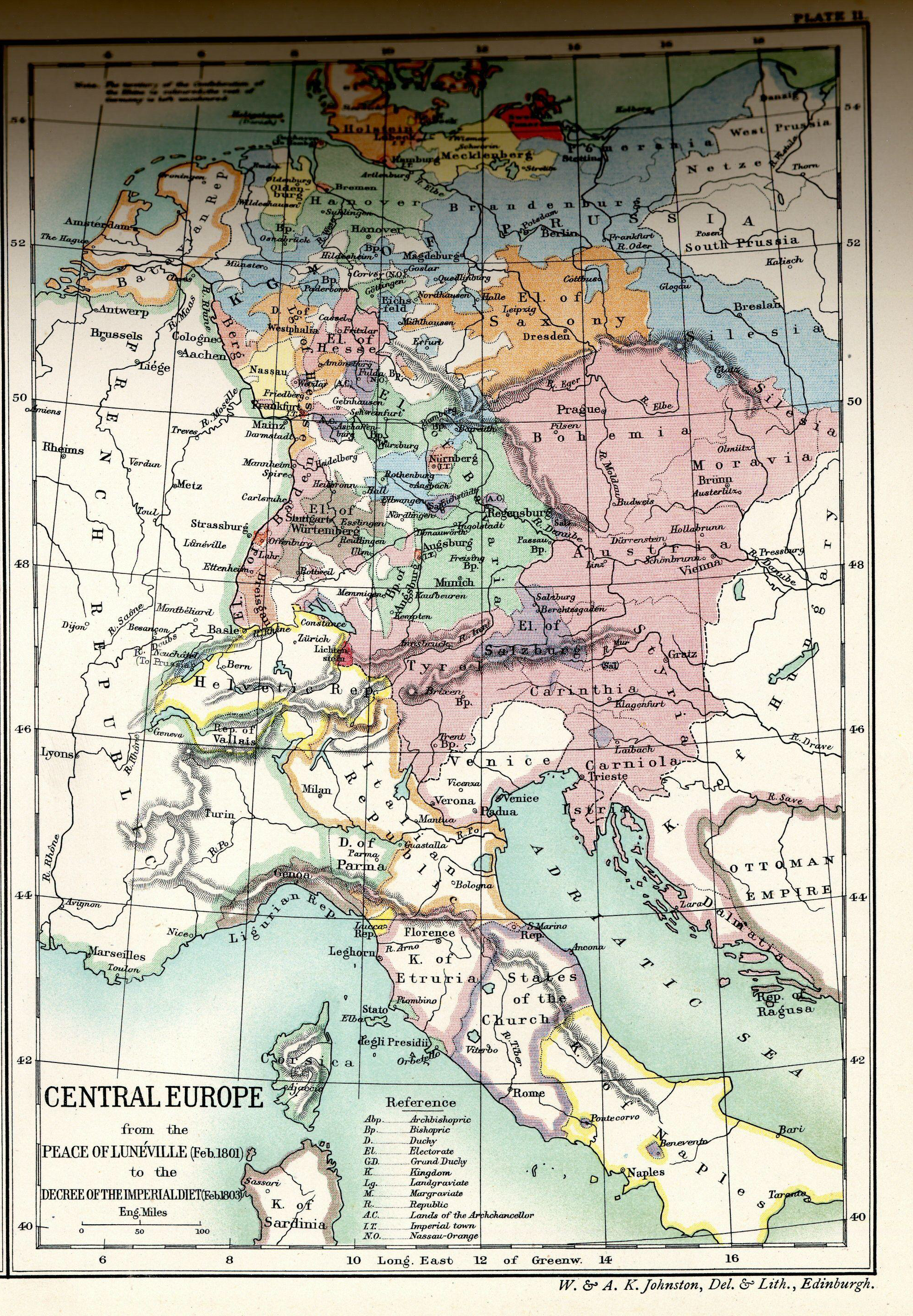
Central Europe from the Peace of Lunéville to the Reichsdeputationshauptschluss

Those princes who lost territory, including the Grand Duke of Tuscany and the Duke of Modena, were to be compensated with territory in Germany east of the Rhine. This was to be accomplished largely thought a programme of secularization of ecclesiastical principalities as laid out at the Congress of Rastatt. France would supervise the process. Although Austria had been promised the Archbishopric of Salzburg and some Bavarian lands at Campo Formio, those promises were withdrawn at Lunéville. The Austrian acquisition of the Venetian Terraferma, Venetian Dalmatia and all of Istria was confirmed.

== Imperial deputation ==
The treaty was accepted by the Imperial Diet on 7 March.

The task of compensation was left to an Imperial deputation (German: Reichsdeputation). France and Russia greatly influenced the negotiations in the Imperial Deputation, with France urging for larger new territories to be formed, which it hoped would later ally with them, and Russia favouring "a more traditional balance". Eventually, the Reichsdeputationshauptschluss (Final Recess of the Imperial Deputation), the final document that reorganised the Empire, was signed on 25 February 1803. The Recess did far more than simply satisfy the need to compensate the princes, but it fundamentally restructured the Empire by secularising all ecclesiastical states except for the Electorate of Mainz. Almost all free imperial cities lost their sovereignty. The Reichsdeputationshauptschluss was the last major law in the history of the Holy Roman Empire before its dissolution in 1806.

== See also ==
- Oranienstein Letters

== Notes ==
Preceded by Second League of Armed Neutrality	French Revolution: Revolutionary campaigns Treaty of Lunéville	Succeeded by Treaty of Florence
