= Goldback =

Fractional gold bullion in a banknote style marketed as a 'Goldback'

- Goldback logo used as of 2026
- Type: Logo
- Inventor: Jeremy Cordon
- Inception: 2019
- Manufacturer: Goldback, Inc.
- Website: goldback.com

The Goldback is a fractional gold commercial product marketed as a local currency and commodity which has seen limited use in some U.S. states, and is sold and marketed by Goldback, Inc. of Utah. The Goldback contains a thin layer of gold within a polymer coating equivalent to 1/1000 of an ounce.

== Overview ==
Goldbacks are shaped like banknotes but contain a small amount of 24 karat gold. The gold is contained between two layers of clear, decorated polyester. Goldbacks are typically sold in increments labelled 1/4, 1/2, 1, 2, 5, 10, 25, and 50, each containing proportionally larger amounts of gold. The value of each denomination is derived from the current gold spot price; a 1 Goldback contains 1/1000 of a troy ounce, so its melt value equals the spot price of gold divided by 1,000. Goldbacks are minted by Valaurum, a private mint.

Valaurum uses a vacuum deposition process to fuse gold together into thin sheets encased in a plastic film designed to hold the gold.

=== Design ===
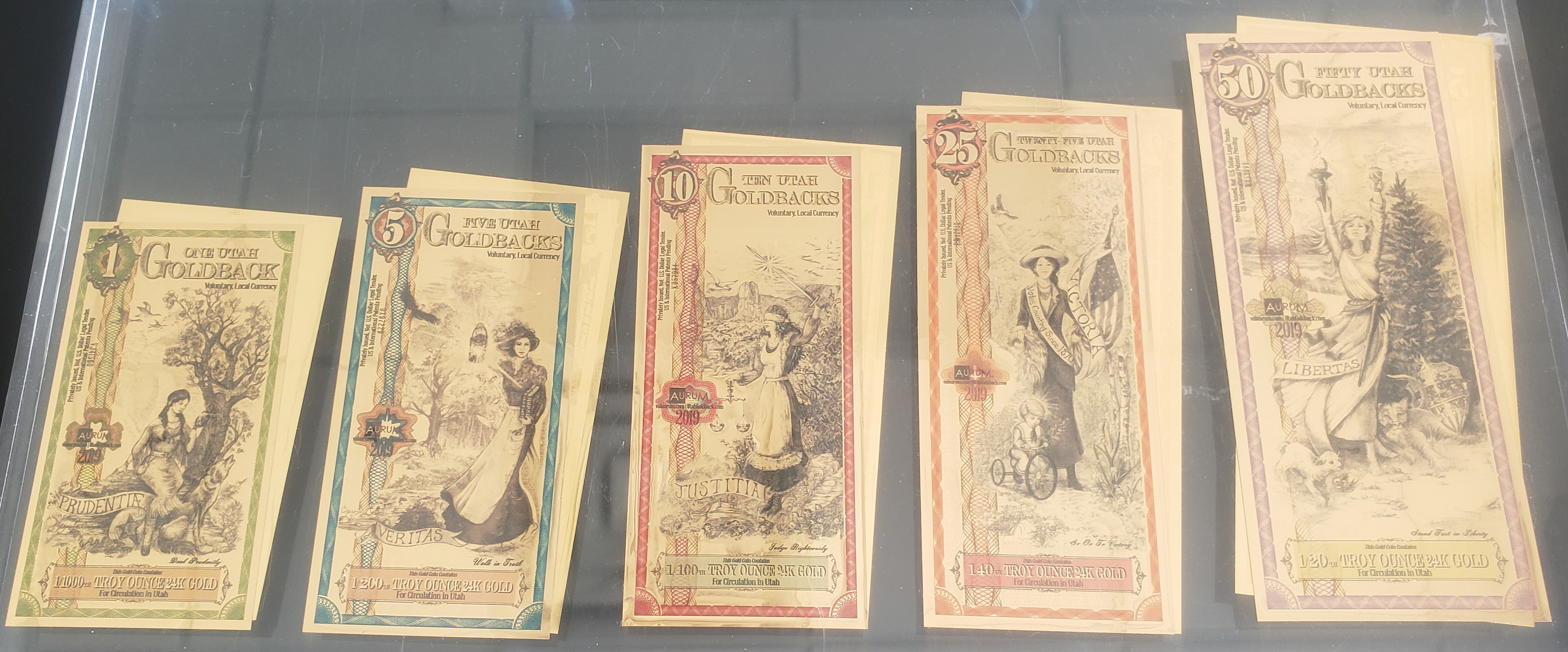
The first run of Utah Goldbacks 2019

Each Goldback features a figure representing a cardinal virtue, as well as animals and plants native to the state they are being marketed in. While each series is different in design, they all contain the same amount of gold.

== History ==
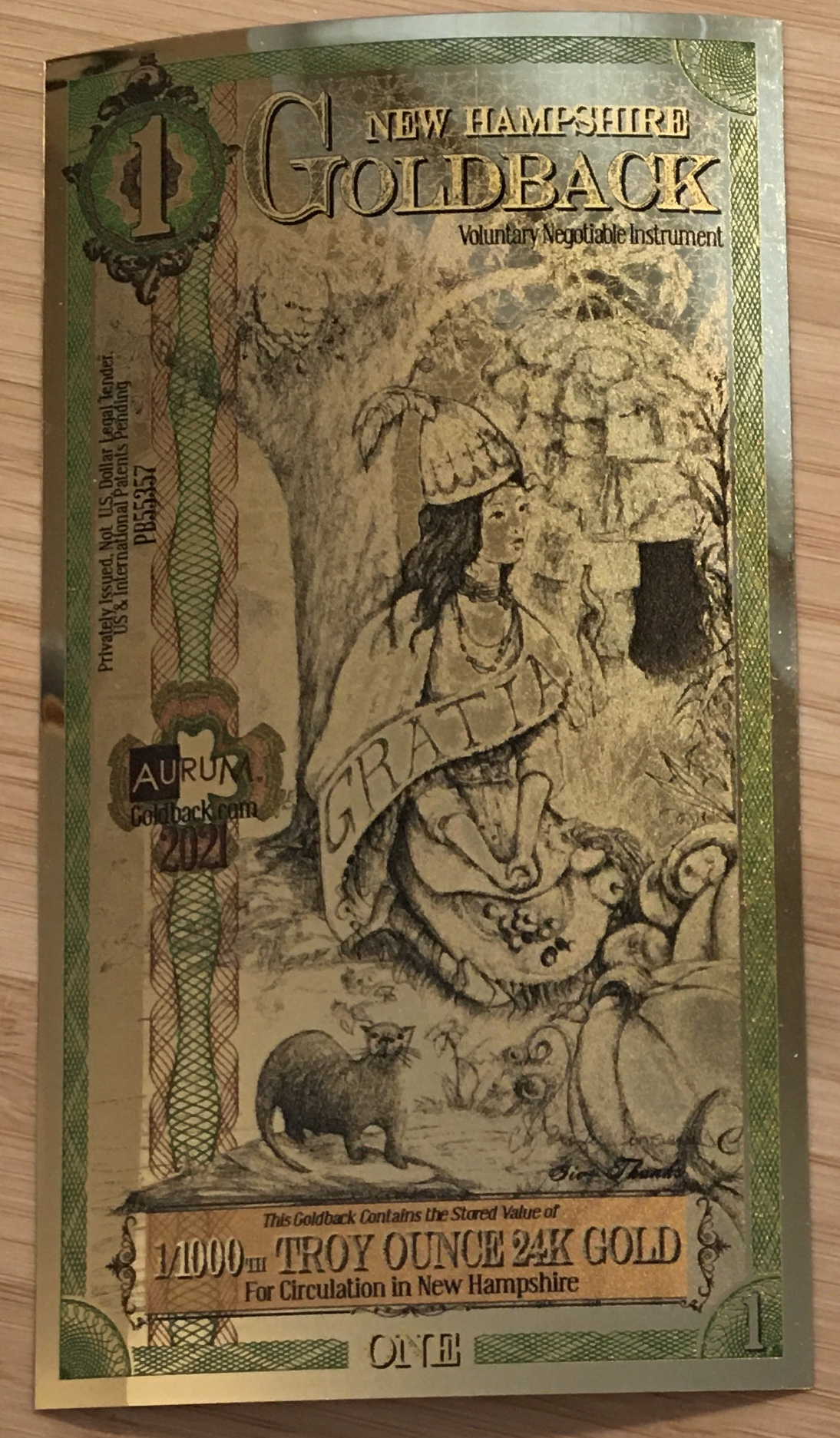
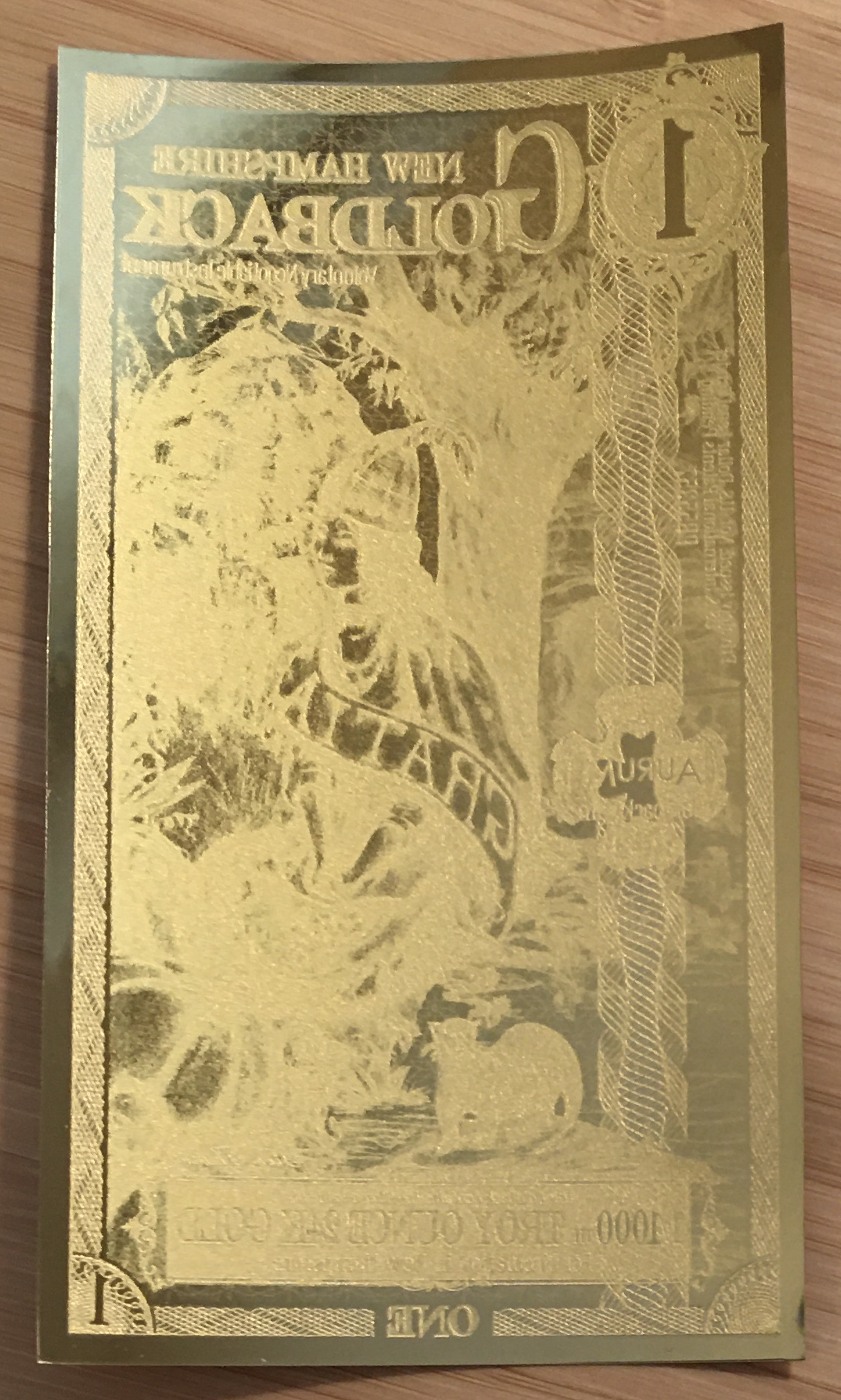
'1' New Hampshire Goldback - Front side (left) and Back side (right)

The Utah Goldback was released in 2019, with later series for Nevada, New Hampshire, Wyoming, Florida, South Dakota, Oklahoma, Arizona, Idaho, and California. The first Goldbacks were made for Utah, partly because the founder and first employees were based out of Utah.

Some individuals and investors have helped front the cost of Goldback manufacturing and series expansion, including Bob Ide for the Wyoming series.

Since its creation in 2019, there have been over 42 Million Goldbacks produced with a value of over $360 Million.

=== Commercial use ===
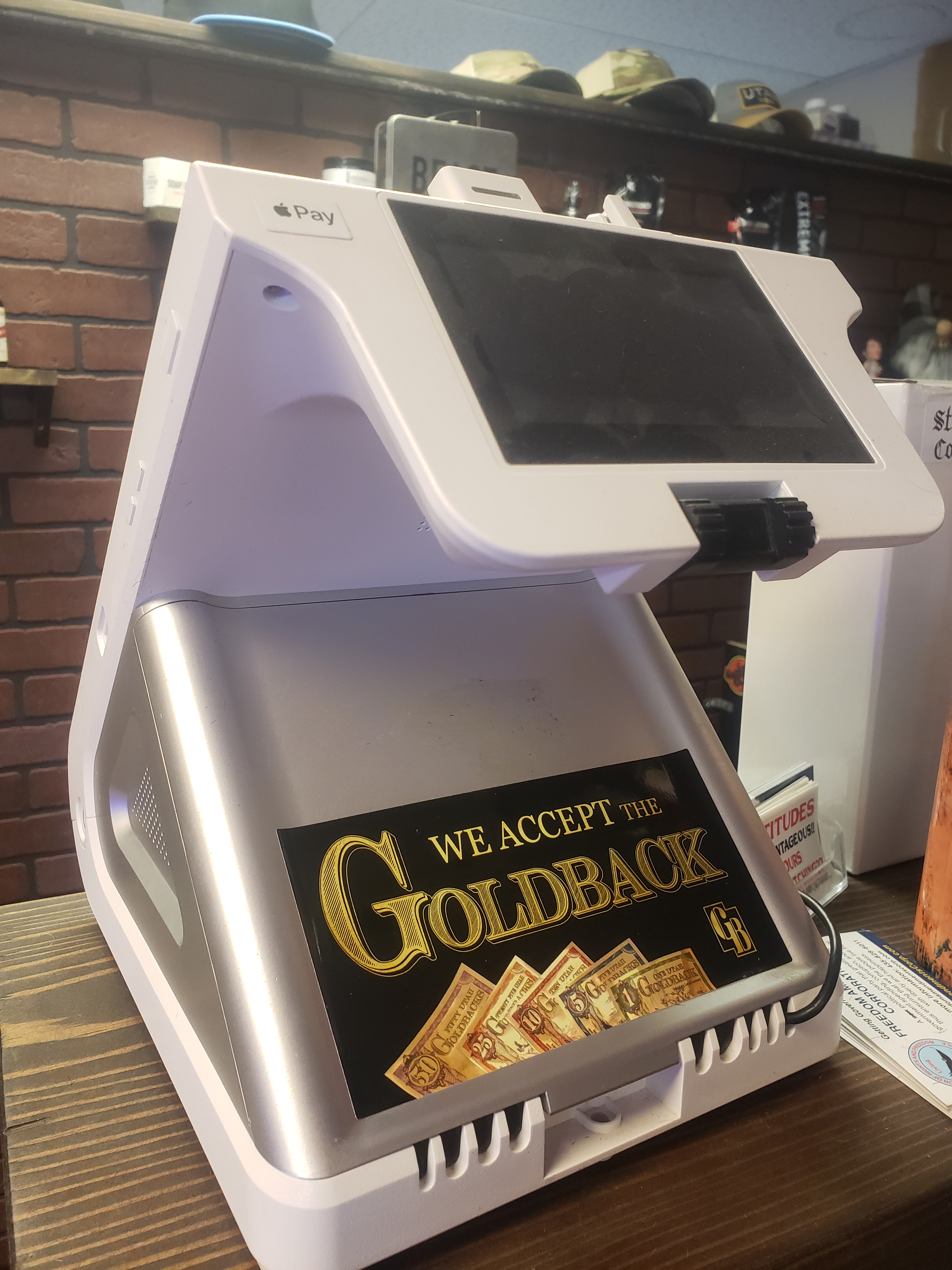
A "We accept the Goldback" sticker on a point-of-sale machine in Utah

KSL 5 TV, the NBC affiliate of Salt Lake City, reported a small number of local businesses accepting using Goldbacks for everyday transactions, and since then that number has grown to around 800 or more.

In association with members of the libertarian Free State Project in New Hampshire, widespread use has been reported of people spending Goldbacks on various goods and services within the state.

According to Goldback Inc., as of October 2026, over 6,000 businesses in the U.S. accept Goldbacks as an alternative form of payment.

=== Legislation ===
The Goldback has not been adopted by any state government; it is privately issued and developed to be used at the local state level.

In Utah, the Utah State Legislature made gold with a "polymer holder" or "coating" not subject to the state sales tax—specifically any metal that, "...has a gold, silver, or platinum metallic content of 50% or more, exclusive of any transparent polymer holder, coating, or encasement..."

In order to avoid issues with federal counterfeit laws, each Goldback is printed with statements such as, "voluntary negotiable instrument" "for circulation" specific to whichever state the particular Goldback in question was 'printed' for. Also, the text "Privately Issued, Not U.S. Dollar Legal Tender. US & International Patents Pending" appears on each Goldback.

== Denominations ==
Denomination	Oz t	mg	Dimensions
1/4	1/4000	7.78	1.99 x 3.23 in | 5.05 x 8.20 cm
1/2	1/2000	15.55	2.56 x 4.38 in | 6.50 x 11.10 cm
1	1/1000	31.10	2.56 x 4.63 in | 6.50 x 11.75 cm
2	1/500	61.21	2.56 x 4.88 in | 6.50 x 12.40 cm
3 (Note: The '3' denomination of Goldbacks are released in limited quantities only.)	3/1000	93.31	2.56 x ?.?? in | 6.50 x ??.?? cm
5	1/200	155.52	2.56 x 5.13 in | 6.50 x 13.00 cm
10	1/100	311.03	2.56 x 5.59 in | 6.50 x 14.20 cm
25	1/40	777.59	2.56 x 6.10 in | 6.50 x 15.50 cm
50	1/20	1555.17	2.95 x 6.97 in | 7.50 x 17.70 cm
100 (Note: Launched in 2025 and discontinued in 2026.)	1/10	3110.35	?.?? x ?.?? in | ?.?? x ??.?? cm

The 100 Goldback was discontinued in early 2026.

=== List of Goldbacks ===
Series	Denomination(s)	First printing	Sources
Arizona	1/2, 1, 2, 3, 5, 10, 25, 50, & 100	2025	
Arizona	1/4	2026	
California	1/4, 1, 3 & 5	2026	
Colorado	1/4, 1/2, 1, 2, 3, 5, 10, 25 & 50	2027	
Dallas Fort Worth - Texas	1	2025	
Florida	1/2, 1, 1/LER, 2, 5, 10, 25, 50, & 100	2025	
Florida	1/4	2026	
Idaho	1/4, 1/2, 1, 2, 3, 5, 10, 25, 50, & 100	2026	
New Hampshire	1, 5, 10, 25, & 50	2020/2021 (Note: The New Hampshire Goldback was officially launched in 2021, however a small number were produced in 2020.)	
Nevada	1, 5, 10, 25, & 50	2020	
Nevada	1/4, 1/2, 1, 2, 3 (LER), 5, 10, 25 & 50	2026	
Ohio	1/4, 1/2, 1, 2, 3, 5, 10, 25 & 50	2027	
Oklahoma	1/2, 1, 2, 3, 5, 10, 25, 50, & 100	2025	
Oklahoma	1/4	2026	
South Dakota	1, 5, 10, 25, & 50	2023	
Utah	1, 5, 10, 25, & 50	2019	
Utah	1/4, 1/2, 1, 2, 3 (LER), 5, 10, 25 & 50	2026	
Washington D.C.	1 & 1/colorized	2026	
Wyoming	1, 5, 10, 25, & 50	2022	

=== Silverbacks ===
Goldback Inc. has also manufactured Silverbacks, containing silver instead of gold. As opposed to Goldbacks, they are intended to serve primarily as collectibles.

Design	Denomination(s)	First printing	Sources
Silver Dragons	1	2022	
Hades	1	2025	
Hera	1	2026	

== See also ==
- Liberty dollar (private currency)
- Utah Legal Tender Act
