= Gold points =

Gold points was a term which referred to the rates of foreign exchange likely to cause movements of gold between countries adhering to the gold standard.

== Application ==
In accordance with the law of supply and demand, the concept determined that the fluctuating limits of currency fixed the cost of money between the place where the bill was drawn and that in where it was payable. In the exchanges rates between gold-standard countries, these limits were known as the gold points, for the reason that, if the price of foreign bills rose above the upper limits determined by the exchange rate, countries would find it cheaper to export gold than to export bills for the purpose of settling international accounts. Conversely, if the exchange rate fell below the lower limit of the determined rate, countries would find it cheaper to import gold than to sell bills to foreign creditors.

Central banks could also influence gold points by changing the costs associated with gold transactions, including the price at which gold was sold and the costs of financing and transporting it. Such measures, sometimes called "gold devices", could be used to influence the movement of gold across national borders.

== See also ==
- Gold standard
- Black Friday (1869) -- Also referred to as the Gold Panic of 1869
- A Program for Monetary Reform (1939) – The Gold Standard
