= Utah Legal Tender Act =

Utah State Legislature
- Passed by: Utah House of Representatives
- Passed: March 4, 2011
- Passed by: Utah State Senate
- Passed: March 10, 2011
- Signed by: Gov. Gary Herbert
- Signed: March 25, 2011

Legislative history

Initiating chamber: Utah House of Representatives
- Bill title: H.B. 317
- Introduced by: Rep. Brad J. Galvez
- First reading: February 24, 2011
- Second reading: March 2, 2011
- Third reading: March 4, 2011

Revising chamber: Utah State Senate
- Bill title: H.B. 317
- Member(s) in charge: Sen. Scott K. Jenkins
- First reading: March 4, 2011
- Second reading: March 9, 2011
- Third reading: March 10, 2011

Summary
- Recognizes gold and silver coins issued by the federal government as legal tender in the state
- Status: In force

The Utah Legal Tender Act, passed March 10, 2011, recognizes gold and silver coins issued by the United States as legal tender in the state of Utah. This includes allowing the state of Utah to pay off debts in gold and silver and allowing individuals to transact in gold and silver coins without paying state capital gains tax, among other provisions. The bill was introduced as HB317 by State Representative Brad J. Galvez.

The law does not violate the constitution of the USA as the constitution allows individual states to make gold and silver legal tender, affording the same power to the federal government but granting the federal government the additional power to issue paper money.
