= Early 1980s recession in the United States =

Economic recession

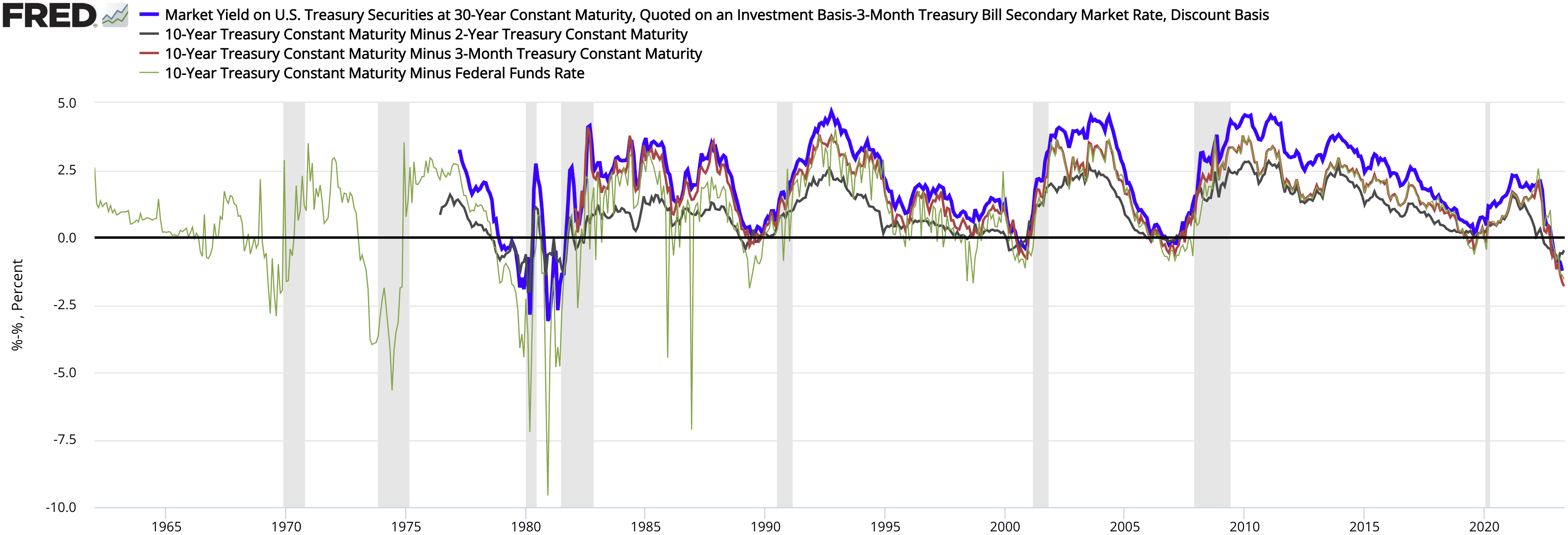
Treasury yield spreads Inverted yield curve in late 1970s and early 1980s 30 year minus 3 month 10 year minus 2 year 10 year minus 3 month 10 year minus Federal funds rate

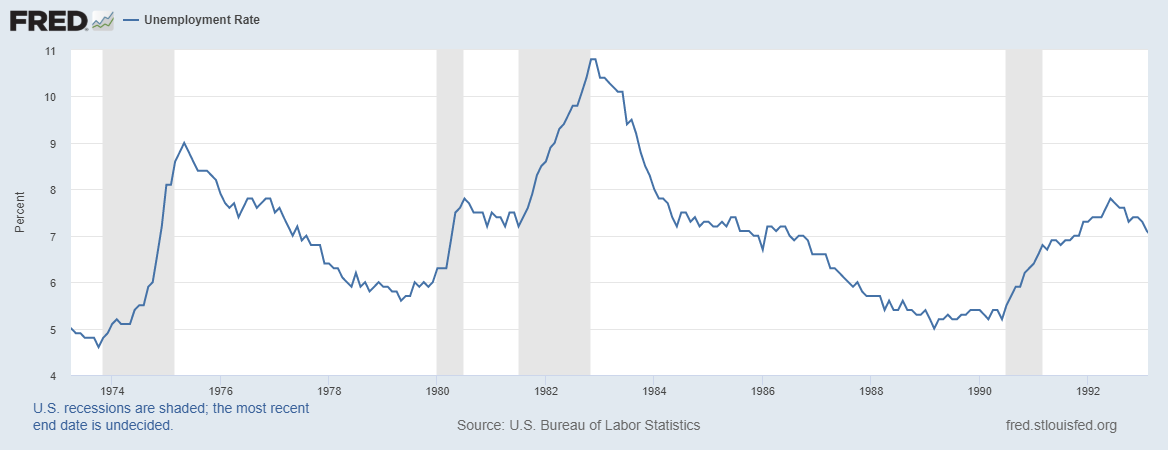
US unemployment rate, 1973–1993

The United States entered recession in January 1980 and returned to growth six months later in July 1980. Although recovery took hold, the unemployment rate remained unchanged through the start of a second recession in July 1981. The downturn ended 16 months later, in November 1982. The economy entered a strong recovery and experienced a lengthy expansion through 1990.

Principal causes of the 1980 recession included contractionary monetary policy undertaken by the Federal Reserve to combat double digit inflation and residual effects of the energy crisis. Manufacturing and construction failed to recover before more aggressive inflation reducing policy was adopted by the Federal Reserve in 1981, causing a second downturn. Due to their proximity and compounded effects, they are commonly referred to as the early 1980s recession, an example of a W-shaped or "double dip" recession; it remains the most recent example of such a recession in the United States.

The recession marked a shift in policy from more traditional Keynesian economics to the adoption of neoliberal economic policies. This change was primarily achieved through tax reform and stronger monetary policy on the part of the Federal Reserve, with the strong recovery and long, stable period of growth that followed increasing the popularity of both concepts in political and academic circles.

== Background ==
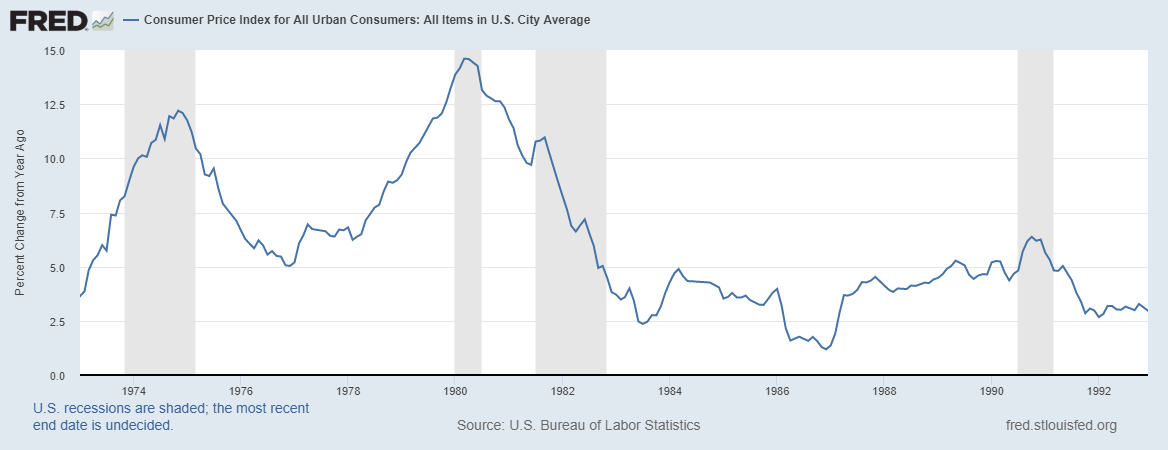
Percent annual change in the US Consumer Price Index, a measure of inflation, 1973–1992

Beginning in 1978, inflation began to intensify, reaching double-digit levels in 1979. The consumer price index rose considerably between 1978 and 1980. These increases were largely attributed to the oil price shocks of 1979 and 1980, although the core consumer price index which excludes energy and food also posted large increases. Productivity, real gross national product, and personal income remained essentially unchanged during this period, while inflation continued to rise, a phenomenon known as stagflation.

In order to combat rising inflation, recently appointed chairman of the Federal Reserve, Paul Volcker, elected to increase the federal funds rate. Following the October 6, 1979 meeting of the Federal Open Market Committee, the federal funds rate increased gradually from 11.5% to an eventual peak of 17.6% in April 1980. This caused an economic recession beginning in January 1980, and in March 1980, president Jimmy Carter created his own plan for credit controls and budget cuts to beat inflation. In order to cooperate with these new priorities, the federal funds rate was lowered considerably from its April peak.

== 1980 ==
A recession occurred beginning in January 1980. As a result of the increasing federal funds rate, credit became more difficult to obtain for car and home loans. This caused severe contractions in manufacturing and housing, which were dependent on the availability of consumer credit. Most of the jobs lost during the recession centered around goods producing industries, while the service sector remained largely intact.

Over the course of the recession, manufacturing shed 1.1 million jobs, with the recession posting a total loss of 1.3 million jobs, representing 1.2% of payrolls. The automotive industry, already in a poor position due to weak sales in 1979, shed 310,000 jobs, representing 33% of that sector. Construction declined by a similar 300,000. Unemployment rose to a recession peak of 7.8% in June 1980, however, it changed very little through the end of the year, averaging 7.5% through the first quarter of 1981.

The official end of the recession was established as of July 1980. As interest rates dropped beginning in May, payrolls turned positive. Unemployment among auto workers rose from a low of 4.8% in 1979 to a record high of 24.7%, then fell to 17.4% by the end of the year. Construction unemployment rose to 16.3%, and also moderated near the end of the year.

During the final quarter of 1980, there were doubts that the economy was in recovery, and instead was experiencing a temporary respite. These concerns were fueled by poor performance in housing and auto sales in the final months of 1980, as well as a second wave of rising interest rates and stagnant unemployment rate.

== 1981–1982 ==
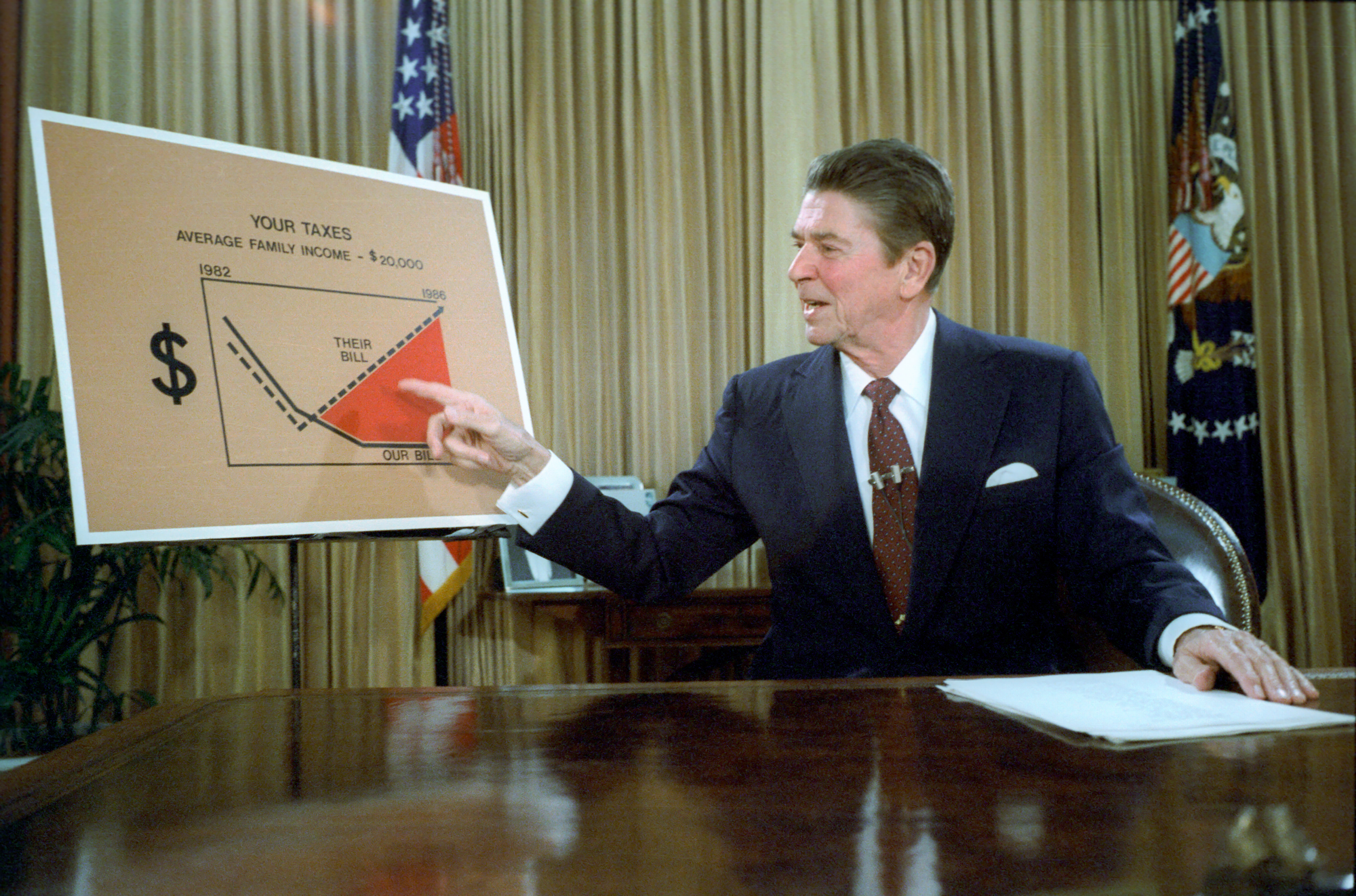
U.S. President Ronald Reagan gives a televised address from the Oval Office outlining his plan for tax reductions in July 1981.

As 1981 began, the Federal Reserve reported that there would be little or no economic growth in 1981, as interest rates were to continue rising in an attempt to reduce inflation.

After failing to gain traction during the weak and brief recovery from the 1980 downturn, weakness in manufacturing and housing caused by rising interest rates began to have an expanded effect on related sectors beginning in mid-1981. Job losses resumed, this time expanding to nearly all employment sectors through the end of 1982. Goods-producing sectors were hardest hit: 90% of all job losses in 1982 came from manufacturing, despite this sector making up only 30% of total non-farm employment. The machinery industry shed 400,000 jobs. Transportation equipment manufacturing fell by 180,000 jobs. Layoffs in electrical and electronics manufacturing exceeded 100,000. The mining sector shed 150,000 jobs, likely a result of high commodity prices and cratering demand from the recession. Construction shed a total of 385,000 jobs from July 1981 through December 1982. Non-durable goods manufacturing (e.g. textiles, rubber, apparel, plastics, tobacco, food, etc.), already under pressure since the mid-1970s, suffered some 365,000 job cuts.

The unemployment rate for auto workers rose from just 3.8% in early-1978 to 24% by the end of 1982; construction worker unemployment peaked at 22% during the same time.

The services sector, while not hit nearly as hard as manufacturing, shed 400,000 jobs during the recession, with sharp declines in transportation, utilities, state & local governments, and wholesale and retail trade. However, the finance, insurance, and real estate sector gained 35,000 jobs over the duration of the recession.

The heavy losses in manufacturing and construction, contrasted with more minor losses in services, also affected the unemployment rates for men and women differently. While the increases in unemployment for both sexes were roughly equal during the recession of 1973-1975 recession, the unemployment rate for men increased 4.5 percentage points during the 1981-1982 recession, while women suffered a comparatively more mild 2.5 percentage point increase in joblessness. Between the fall of 1981 and the end of 1982, nearly 70% of the increase in unemployment came from men's unemployment.

Unemployment had changed very little in the period between the end of the 1980 recession and the July 1981 start of the second, never dropping below 7.2%. Unemployment rose to double digits for the first time since 1941 in September 1982, and stood at a postwar high of 10.8% by the end of the year. The total increase in unemployment was 3.6%, which was less than the 1973–75 recession increase of 3.8%, yet still higher than the 2.9% average. Because the recession began with already elevated levels of unemployment, the increase easily pushed it higher than any other post-war recession. Overall, the recession caused the loss of 2.9 million jobs, representing a 3.0% drop in payroll employment, the largest percentage decline since the 1957–1958 recession. The number of underemployed workers (those who are working part-time but want full-time work) rose to the highest number ever recorded at that time since data collection began in 1955.

Unemployment was particularly severe amongst teenagers and racial minorities: the unemployment rates for Black Americans peaked at 20% in December 1982, compared to 15% for Latinos and 9.3% for white Americans. Teen unemployment hit 24%, and was particularly severe amongst Black teenagers: for most of 1982, unemployment for Black teenagers stayed at roughly 50%.

Ronald Reagan, who had assumed office in January 1981, brought his own economic plan to the table. In August 1981, the president signed the Economic Recovery Tax Act of 1981, a three-year tax cut plan. As the recession deepened in 1982, Reagan's approval rating also dropped. As a result, during the 1982 midterm elections, Republican gains made in the House of Representatives during the 1980 election were reversed. However, control of the Senate was retained by the Republicans.

== Recovery ==
In July 1983, the official end of the recession was announced as November 1982, with the employment trough occurring in December. At the time of the announcement, output and sales had already met or exceeded levels achieved before the recession began. Through December 1983, nonfarm payrolls rose by 2.9 million and the unemployment rate fell by 2.5%. The auto industry had posted losses of $187 million in the third quarter of 1982, which turned into a gain of $1.2 billion during the same period in 1983. To prevent a new surge of inflation, interest and mortgage rates remained abnormally high throughout 1983, delaying a recovery in construction and housing.

A comparative analysis of the first six quarters of post-war economic recoveries published in the August 1984 issue of the Monthly Labor Review indicated the 1983–1984 recovery was stronger than any post-war recovery since that of the 1953 recession. As the third year of recovery drew to a close in 1985, payroll employment had grown by 10 million since the end of the recession. Growth continued through July 1990, creating what was at the time the longest peacetime economic expansion in U.S. history.

== Impact ==
Although the economy recovered in 1983, the residual effects of high inflation and high interest rates had a profound impact on the savings and loans industry. Savings and loan associations were limited by interest rate ceilings. As a result of rising interest rates, many savings and loan institutions experienced frequent account withdrawals, as depositors moved their money to higher-earning accounts offered by commercial banks. The already struggling savings and loans industry posted large losses in 1981 and 1982.

High mortgage rates eroded the value of mortgage-backed loans, the primary asset of savings and loan associations. These fixed-rate loans were sold at a loss in order to balance withdrawals. This asset liability mismatch was identified as the primary cause of the savings and loan crisis.

== Long-term effects ==
Although the U.S. macroeconomy recovered during the 1983-1990 economic expansion period, the early-1980s recession cast a long shadow over many parts of the United States, especially those reliant on heavy industry. For example, heavily industrialized Lake County, Indiana (home to major manufacturing cities such as Gary, East Chicago, and Hammond), did not recover its 1980 employment level until 1996. And as of 2010, the county's inflation-adjusted output has stubbornly remained 15-20% below its 1978 peak. Other steel-producing regions, such as the south side of Chicago, the Mahoning Valley, Cleveland, and Pittsburgh, had been struggling since the onset of the 1973-75 recession, but it was the early-1980s recession that left deep and lasting damage to local economies. Mining communities in Minnesota's Iron Range, Wisconsin's Driftless Area, eastern Kentucky, and West Virginia were also devastated after years of struggle.

Although inflation subsided and interest rates began to decline starting in 1983, the Federal Reserve was still committed to a strong-dollar policy through the mid-1980s. This prevented a recovery in manufacturing by undermining the competitiveness of exports of American manufactured goods (particularly automobiles and steel). It was not until 1985 that the Reagan administration and the Federal Reserve took action to correct this when the U.S. signed the Plaza Accord with France, West Germany, Japan, and the United Kingdom. As the U.S. Dollar depreciated some 50% against these major currencies, this agreement (combined with voluntary export restrictions) did help American exports recover, particularly in the automotive sector: by the early-1990s, the number of vehicles assembled by Japanese automakers in U.S. plants exceeded the number of auto exports from Japan to the U.S., a trend that still continues into the 2010s. However, many of the auto manufacturing plants were set up in states with right-to-work laws, primarily in the South and West. The Rust Belt states, particularly the auto-making states of Ohio, Michigan, and Indiana, did not always reap the full benefits of this change.

U.S. manufacturing employment peaked at 19.5 million in June 1979, before sharply declining by 2.8 million to 16.7 million before bottoming out in January 1983. Although 1.2 million manufacturing jobs would be created during the 1983-1990 period, the 1979 peak would never be reached again. The recession heralded a sustained deindustrialisation in the United States that has since accelerated thanks to globalisation and outsourcing.
