= Soddy =

Soddy may refer to:

- Alexander Soddy (born 1982), British conductor and pianist
- Frederick Soddy (1877–1956), English chemist
- Soddy (crater), a lunar crater named for Frederick Soddy
- Sod house or Soddy, a house built using patches of sod
- Soddy-Daisy, Tennessee
