= Economic history of the world =

The economic history of the world encompasses the development of human economic activity throughout time. It has been estimated that throughout prehistory, the world average GDP per capita was about $158 per annum (inflation adjusted for 2013), and did not rise much until the Industrial Revolution. Cattle were probably the first objects or physical things specifically used in a way similar enough to the modern definition of money, that is, as a medium for exchange.

By the 3rd millennium BC, Ancient Egypt was home to almost half of the global population. The city states of Sumer developed a trade and market economy based originally on the ancient coin, usually of silver, of the shekel which was a certain weight measure of barley, while the Babylonians and their city state neighbors later developed the earliest system of prices using a measure of various commercial products that was fixed in a legal code. The early law codes from Sumer could be considered the first (written) financial law, and had many attributes still in use in the current price system today. Temples are history's first documented creditors at interest, beginning in Sumer in the third millennium. Later, in their embassy functions, they legitimized profit‑seeking trade, as well as by being a major beneficiary. According to Herodotus, and most modern scholars, the Lydians were the first people to introduce the use of gold and silver coin around 650–600 BC.

The first economist (at least from within opinion generated by the evidence of extant writings) is considered to be Hesiod, by the fact of his having written on the fundamental subject of the scarcity of resources, in Works and Days.

Eventually, the Indian subcontinent and China accounted for more than half the size of the world economy for the next 1,500 years. In the Middle Ages, the world economy slowly expanded with the increase of population and trade. During the early period of the Middle Ages, Europe was an economic backwater. However, by the later Medieval period, rich trading cities in Italy emerged, creating the first modern accounting and finance systems.

During the Industrial Revolution, economic growth in the modern sense first occurred during the Industrial Revolution in Britain and then in the rest of Europe due to high amounts of energy conversion. Economic growth spread to all regions of the world during the twentieth century, when world GDP per capita quintupled. The highest growth occurred in the 1960s during post-war reconstruction. In particular, shipping containers revolutionized trade in the second half of the century, by making it cheaper to transport goods, especially internationally. These gains have not been uniform across the globe; there are still many countries where people, especially young children, die from what are now preventable diseases, such as rotavirus and polio.

The Great Recession happened from 2007 to 2009. Since 2020, economies have suffered from the COVID-19 recession.

== Stone Age ==
=== Paleolithic ===
Throughout the Paleolithic Era, which was between 500,000 and 10,000 BC, the primary socio-economic unit was the band (small kin group). Communication between bands occurred for the purposes of trading ideas, stories, tools, foods, animal skins, mates, and other commodities. Economic resources were constrained by typical ecosystem factors: density and replacement rates of edible flora and fauna, competition from other consumers (organisms) and climate. Throughout the Upper Paleolithic, humans both dispersed and adapted to a greater variety of environments, and also developed their technologies and behaviors to increase productivity in existing environments taking the global population to between 1 and 15 million.

It has been estimated that throughout prehistory, the world average GDP per capita was about $158 per annum (inflation adjusted for 2013), and did not rise much until the Industrial Revolution.

=== Mesolithic ===
This period began with the end of the last glacial period over 10,000 years ago involving the gradual domestication of plants and animals and the formation of settled communities at various times and places.

=== Neolithic ===
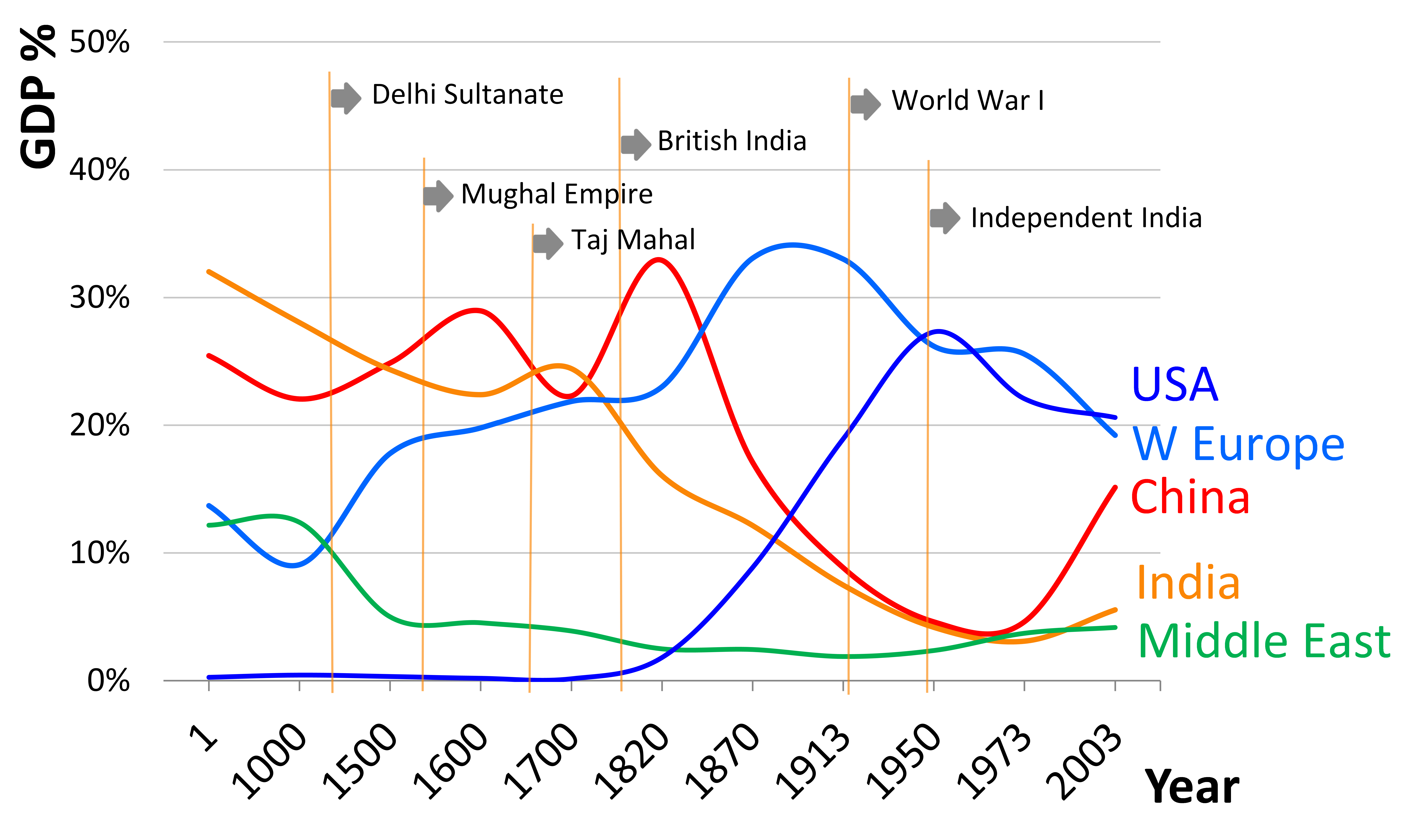
The global contribution to world's GDP by major economies from 1 CE to 2003 CE according to Angus Maddison's estimates. Up until the early 18th century, India and China were the two largest economies by GDP output.

Within each tribe the activity of individuals was differentiated to specific activities, and the characteristic of some of these activities were limited by the resources naturally present and available from within each tribe's territory, creating specializations of skill.

[By the] division of labour and evolution of new crafts ... tribal units became naturally isolated through time from the over-all developments in skill and technique present within their neighbouring environment. To utilize artifacts made by tribes specializing in areas of production not present to other tribes, exchange and trade became necessary.

Cattle were probably the first object or physical thing specifically used in a way similar enough to the modern definition of money, that is, as a medium for exchange.

Trading in red ochre is attested in Swaziland, shell jewellery in the form of strung beads also dates back to this period, and had the basic attributes needed of commodity money. To organize production and to distribute goods and services among their populations, before market economies existed, people relied on tradition, top-down command, or community cooperation.

Agriculture emerged in the fertile crescent, and soon after and apparently independently, in South and East Asia, and the Americas. Cultivation provided complementary carbohydrates in diets, and could potentially produce a surplus to feed off-farm workers enabling the development of diversified and stratified societies (including a standing military and 'leisured class'). Soon after livestock became domesticated particularly in the Middle East (goats, sheep, cattle), enabling pastoral societies to develop, to exploit lower productivity grasslands unsuited to agriculture.

== Early antiquity: Bronze and Iron Ages ==
=== Early developments in formal money and finance ===
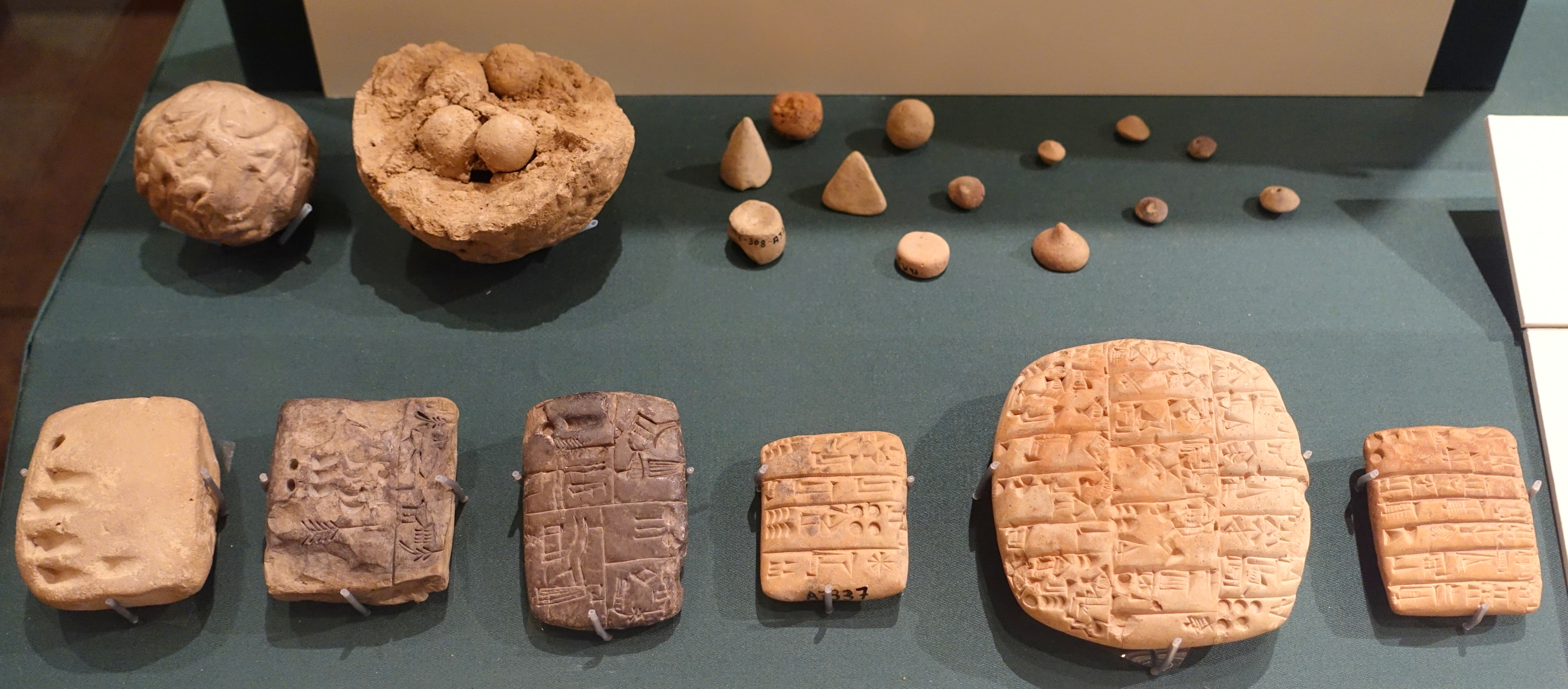
A collection of clay bullae, accounting tokens, and tablets used to facilitate accounting in ancient Mesopotamia, Oriental Institute Museum

Ancient Egypt was home to almost half of the global population by 30th century BC. The city states of Sumer developed a trade and market economy based originally on the commodity money of the shekel which was a certain weight measure of barley, while the Babylonians and their city state neighbors later developed the earliest system of prices using a measure of various commodities that was fixed in a legal code. The early law codes from Sumer could be considered the first (written) financial law, and had many attributes still in use in the current price system today; such as codified quantities of money for business deals (interest rates), fines for 'wrongdoing', inheritance rules, laws concerning how private property is to be taxed or divided, within etc. For a summary of the laws, see Babylonian law.

Temples are history's first documented creditors at interest, beginning in Sumer in the third millennium. By charging interest and ground rent on their own assets and property, temples helped legitimize the idea of interest‑bearing debt and profit seeking in general. Later, while the temples no longer included the handicraft workshops which characterized third‑millennium Mesopotamia, in their embassy functions they legitimized profit‑seeking trade, as well as by being a major beneficiary.

== Classical and late antiquity ==
The Roman Empire became one of the largest empires of the ancient world, with an estimated population of roughly 45 to 60 million in the first and second centuries AD and an area of about 5.0 million square kilometers at its height in AD 117. From AD 1 to about 1600, economic historian Angus Maddison estimates that India and China together produced roughly half or more of world GDP.

=== Expedition and long distance commerce ===
The two major changes in commercial activity due to expedition known by historical recounting, are those led by Alexander the Great, which facilitated multi-national trade, and the Roman conquest of Gaul and invasions of Britain led by Julius Caesar.

=== External trade with the Roman Empire ===
During the time of the trade of the Occident with Rome, Egypt was the wealthiest of all places within the Roman Empire. The merchants of Rome acquired produce from Persia through Egypt, by way of the port of Berenice, and subsequently the Nile.

=== Introduction of coinage ===
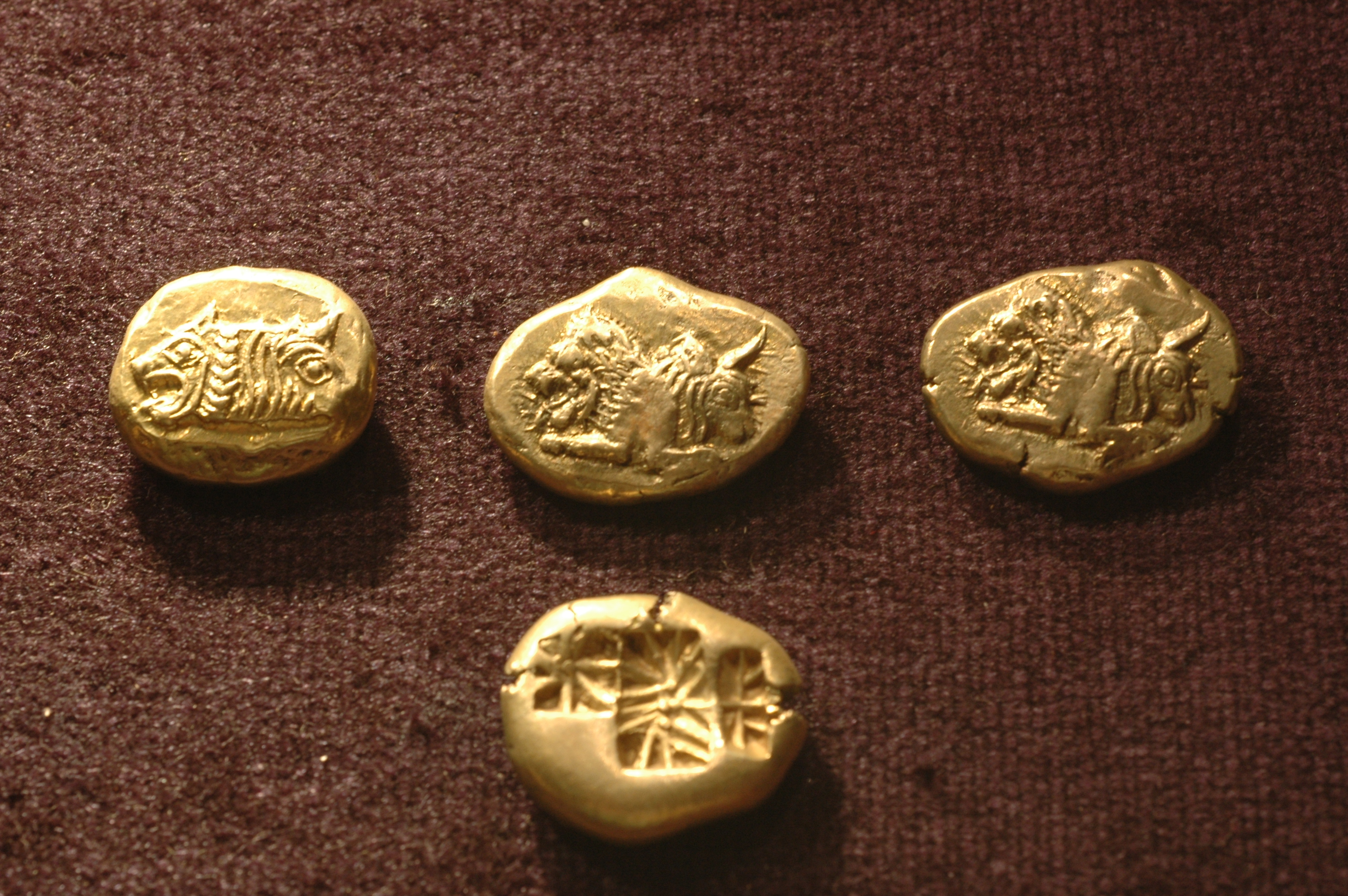
Lydian stater coins made from a mixture of silver, gold, and electrum, c. 6th century BC

According to Herodotus, and most modern scholars, the Lydians were the first people to introduce the use of gold and silver coin. It is thought that these first stamped coins were minted around 650–600 BC. A stater coin was made in the stater (trite) denomination. To complement the stater, fractions were made: the trite (third), the hekte (sixth), and so forth in lower denominations.

=== Developments in economic awareness and thought ===
The first economist (at least from within opinion generated by the evidence of extant writings) is considered to be Hesiod, by the fact of his having written on the fundamental subject of the scarcity of resources, in Works and Days.

The Arthashastra, an Indian work that includes sections on political economy, was composed between the 2nd and 3rd centuries BCE, and is often credited to the Indian thinker Chanakya.

Greek and Roman thinkers made various economic observations, especially Aristotle and Xenophon. Many other Greek writings show understanding of sophisticated economic concepts. For instance, a form of Gresham's law is presented in Aristophanes' Frogs.

Bryson of Heraclea was a neo-platonic who is cited as having heavily influenced early Muslim economic scholarship.

== Middle Ages ==
In the Middle Ages the world economy slowly expanded with the increase of population and trade. The Silk Road was used for trading between Europe, Central Asia and China. During the early period of the Middle Ages, Europe was an economic backwater, however, by the later Medieval period rich trading cities in Italy emerged, creating the first modern accounting and finance systems.

The field of Islamic economics was also introduced. The first banknotes were used in Tang dynasty China in the ninth century (with expanded use during the Song dynasty).

== Modern era ==
=== Early modern era ===
The early modern era was a time of mercantilism, colonialism, nationalism, and international trade. The waning of feudalism saw new national economic frameworks begin to be strengthened. After the voyages of Christopher Columbus et al. opened up new opportunities for trade with the New World and Asia, newly-powerful monarchies wanted a more powerful military state to boost their status. Mercantilism was a political movement and an economic theory that advocated the use of the state's military power to ensure that local markets and supply sources were protected.

The first banknote in Europe was issued by Stockholms Banco in 1661.

During the 17th and early 18th centuries, Mughal India produced roughly a quarter of world GDP. Its wealthiest province, Bengal Subah, had globally significant industries, including cotton and silk textiles, shipbuilding, and salt manufacturing, before the British Industrial Revolution.

=== Industrial Revolution ===
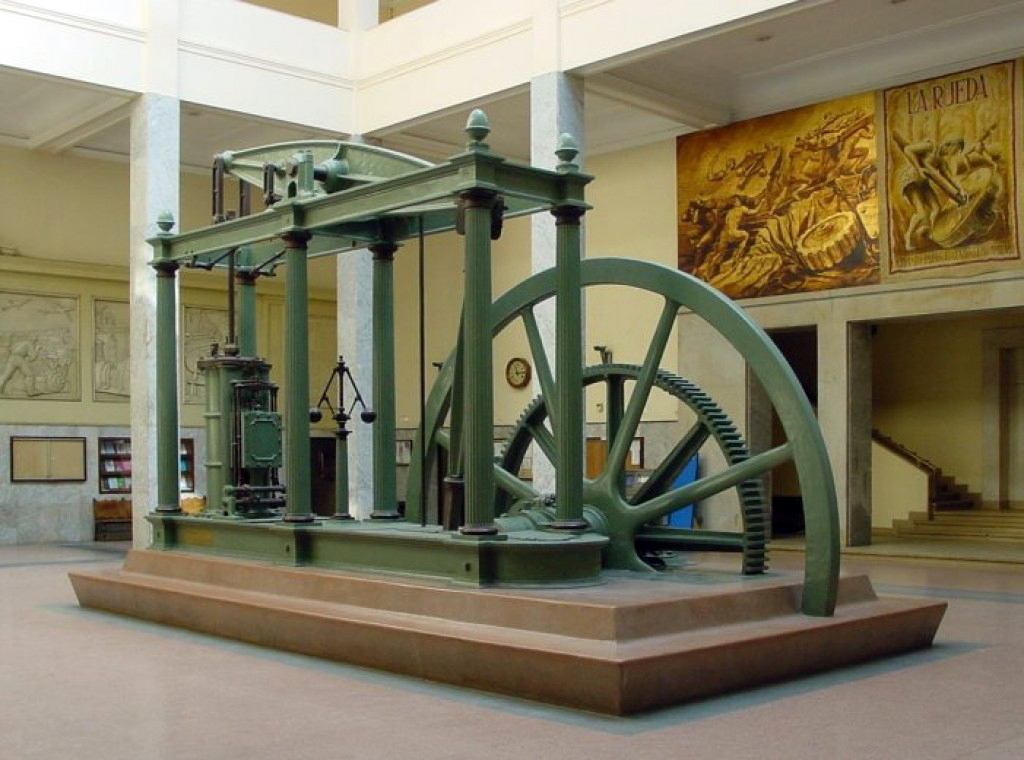
A Watt steam engine, the steam engine fuelled primarily by coal that propelled the Industrial Revolution in Britain and the world. (Note: Watt steam engine image: located in the lobby of into the Superior Technical School of Industrial Engineers of the UPM (Madrid).)

Economic history as it relates to economic growth in the modern sense first occurred during the Industrial Revolution in Britain and then in the rest of Europe, due to high amounts of energy conversion taking place. Global nominal income expanded to $100 billion by 1880.

After 1860, the enormous expansion of wheat production in the United States flooded the world market, lowering prices by 40%, and (along with the expansion of potato growing) made a major contribution to the nutritional welfare of the poor.

=== 20th century ===
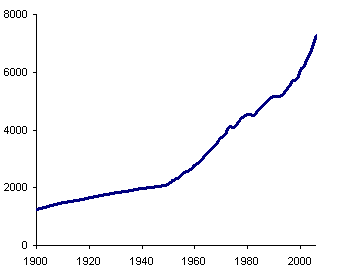
World GDP per capita in dollars during the twentieth century. Data before 1950 is not annual.

Economic growth spread to all regions of the world during the twentieth century, when world GDP per capita quintupled. The highest growth occurred in the 1960s during post-war reconstruction. Global nominal income expanded to $1 trillion by 1960 and $10 trillion by 1980. Some increase in the volume of international trade is due to the reclassification of within-country trade to international trade due to the increasing number of countries and resulting changes in national boundaries, however, the effect is small.

In particular, shipping containers revolutionized trade in the second half of the century, by making it cheaper to transport goods domestically and internationally.

The economic boom of the 50s and 60s ended in the 70s with the 1973 oil crisis and the 1979 oil crisis. The former began in October 1973 when members of the Organization of Arab Petroleum Exporting Countries (OAPEC), led by King Faisal of Saudi Arabia, proclaimed an oil embargo against countries that supported Israel during the Yom Kippur War leading to the price of oil rising to nearly 300%, from US$3 per barrel ($19/m^3) to nearly $12 per barrel ($75/m^3) globally. The latter happened in the wake of Iranian Revolution and the Iran-Iraq War where oil production from Iran and Iraq decreased dramatically raising the prices of oil doubling it to $39.50 per barrel ($248/m^3). Oil prices did not return to pre-crisis levels until the mid-1980s.

=== 21st century ===
Despite setbacks related to the global economic crisis or the "Great Recession" that was mostly predicated on housing and an increase in the use of leverage by both banks and households, the late twentieth and early twenty-first century has seen great increases in global GDP. Much of these increase are due to technological innovations, such as high-speed internet, smartphones, and numerous other technological advances that have changed the way much of the population lives, unlike any other economic period in history. These gains have not been uniform across the globe and there are still many countries where people, and especially young children die from what are now preventable diseases, such as rotovirus and polio.

The Great Recession happened from 2007 to 2009. Global nominal income expanded to $100 trillion by 2020. Since 2020, economies have suffered from the COVID-19 recession.

== See also ==
- Economic history, the methods of study
- Energy economics
- Global financial system
- Lists of recessions
- List of regions by past GDP (PPP)
- Money
- Natural capital
- Timeline of international trade
- Wealth, Virtual Wealth and Debt
