= Economic depression =

Sustained downturn in economic activity

An economic depression is a period of carried long-term economic downturn that is the result of lowered economic activity in one or more major national economies. It is often understood in economics that an economic crisis and the following recession that may be termed an economic depression are part of economic cycles where the slowdown of the economy follows economic growth and vice versa. It is a result of more severe economic problems or a downturn than a recession itself, which is a slowdown in economic activity over the course of the normal business cycle of a growing economy.

Economic depressions may also be characterized by their length or duration, showing increases in unemployment, larger increases in unemployment or even abnormally large levels of unemployment. For example, some problems in Japan in incorporating a digital economy, that such technological difficulty resulting in large unemployment rates or lack of social balance in employment among population, lesser revenues for businesses, or other economic difficulties, with having signs of financial crisis, that may also reflect on the work of banks, or may result in a banking crisis (in various ways that may be for example unauthorized transformations of banks), and further the crisis in investment and credit; that further could reflect on innovation and new businesses investments lessening or even shrinking, or buyers dry up in recession and suppliers cut back on production and investment in technology, in financial crisis that may be more country defaults or debt problems, and further in feared businesses bankruptcies, and overall business slowdown. Other bad signs of economic depression could be significantly reduced amounts of trade and commerce (especially international trade), as well as in currency markets that may be fluctuations or unexpected exchange rates with observed highly volatile currency value fluctuations (often due to relative currency devaluations). Other signs of depression are prices deflation, financial crises, stock market crash or even bank failures, or even specific behaviour of economic agents or population, that are also common or also non common elements of a depression that do not normally occur during a recession.

== Definitions ==
In the United States the National Bureau of Economic Research determines contractions and expansions in the business cycle, but does not declare depressions. Generally, periods labeled depressions are marked by a substantial and sustained shortfall of the ability to purchase goods relative to the amount that could be produced using current resources and technology (potential output). Another proposed definition of depression includes two general rules:

1. a decline in real GDP exceeding 10%, or
2. a recession lasting 2 or more years.

There are also differences in the duration of depression across definitions. Some economists refer only to the period when economic activity is declining. The more common use, however, also encompasses the time until the economic activity has returned close to normal levels.

A recession is briefly defined as a period of declining economic activity spread across the economy (according to NBER). Under the first definition, each depression will always coincide with a recession, since the difference between a depression and a recession is the severity of the fall in economic activity. In other words, each depression is always a recession, sharing the same starting and ending dates and having the same duration.

Under the second definition, depressions and recessions will always be distinct events however, having the same starting dates. This definition of depression implies that a recession and a depression will have different ending dates and thus distinct durations. Under this definition, the length of depression will always be longer than that of the recession starting the same date.

A useful example is a difference in the chronology of the Great Depression in the U.S. under the view of alternative definitions. Using the second definition of depression, most economists refer to the Great Depression, as the period between 1929 and 1941. On the other hand, using the first definition, the depression that started in August 1929 lasted until March 1933. Note that NBER, which publishes the recession (instead of depression) dates for the U.S. economy, has identified two recessions during that period. The first between August 1929 and March 1933 and the second starting in May 1937 and ending in June 1938.

== Terminology ==
Today the term "depression" is most often associated with the Great Depression of the 1930s, but the term had been in use long before then. Indeed, an early major American economic crisis, the Panic of 1819, was described by then-president James Monroe as "a depression", and the economic crisis immediately preceding the 1930s depression, the Depression of 1920–21, was referred to as a "depression" by president Calvin Coolidge.

However, in the 19th and early 20th centuries, financial crises were traditionally referred to as "panics", e.g., the 'major' Panic of 1907, and the 'minor' Panic of 1910–1911, though the 1929 crisis was more commonly called "The Crash", and the term "panic" has since fallen out of use. At the time of the Great Depression (of the 1930s), the phrase "The Great Depression" had already been used to refer to the period 1873–96 (in the United Kingdom), or more narrowly 1873–79 (in the United States), which has since been renamed the Long Depression.

Common use of the phrase "The Great Depression" for the 1930s crisis is most frequently attributed to British economist Lionel Robbins, whose 1934 book The Great Depression is credited with 'formalizing' the phrase, though US president Herbert Hoover is widely credited with having 'popularized' the term/phrase, informally referring to the downturn as a "depression", with such uses as "Economic depression cannot be cured by legislative action or executive pronouncement", (December 1930, Message to Congress) and "I need not recount to you that the world is passing through a great depression" (1931).

== Occurrence ==
Due to the lack of an agreed definition and the strong negative associations of the word "depression", the characterization of any period as a depression is contentious. From the early-19th century until the 1930s the term frequently identified regional crises and the more widespread crises of the 1870s and 1930s, but economic crises since 1945 have generally been referred to as "recessions", with the 1970s global crisis referred to as "stagflation", but not as a depression. The only two eras commonly referred to at the current time as "depressions" are the 1870s and 1930s.

To some degree, this is simply a stylistic change, similar to the decline in the use of "panic" to refer to financial crises, but it does also reflect that the economic cycle – both in the United States and in most OECD countries – though not in all – has been more moderate since 1945.

There have been many periods of prolonged economic underperformance in particular countries/regions since 1945, detailed below, but terming these as "depressions" is controversial. The 2008–2009 economic cycle, which has comprised the most significant global crisis since the Great Depression, has at times been termed a depression, but this terminology is not widely used, with the episode instead being referred to by other terms, such as the "Great Recession".

Economic cycles with economic declines have a long history. Results of the Black Death in 14th-centuhry England provide a possible example. Later cases include the Post-Napoleonic Depression of 1815 onwards. Nineteenth-century globalising tendencies and growth in the gathering of statistics help to identify economic trends.

== Notable depressions ==
=== The General Crisis of 1640 ===
Perhaps the largest depression of all time occurred during the General Crisis. The Ming Empire of China collapsed, revolutions and revolts were seen all across Europe and its empires, and the Stuart Monarchy fought a civil war on three fronts in Ireland, Scotland, and England. Thomas Hobbes, an English philosopher, created what was at the time the most developed explanation of the need for a universal Social Contract in his 1651 book Leviathan based on the general misery within society during this period.

Recent work by Geoffrey Parker suggests these simultaneous crises occurred due to a change in climate, possibly a reduction in solar energy reaching earth and thus lower crop yields.

=== Great depression of 1837 ===
This depression is acknowledged to be a worse depression in the United States than the later Great Depression of the 1930s. This depression ended in the United States due to the California gold rush and its tenfold addition to the United States' gold reserves. As with most depressions, it was followed by a thirty-year period of a booming economy in the United States, which is now called the Second Industrial Revolution (of the 1850s).

==== Panic of 1837 ====
The Panic of 1837 was an American financial crisis, built on a speculative real estate market. The bubble burst on 10 May 1837 in New York City, when every bank stopped payment in gold and silver coinage. The Panic was followed by a five-year depression, with the failure of banks and record high unemployment levels.

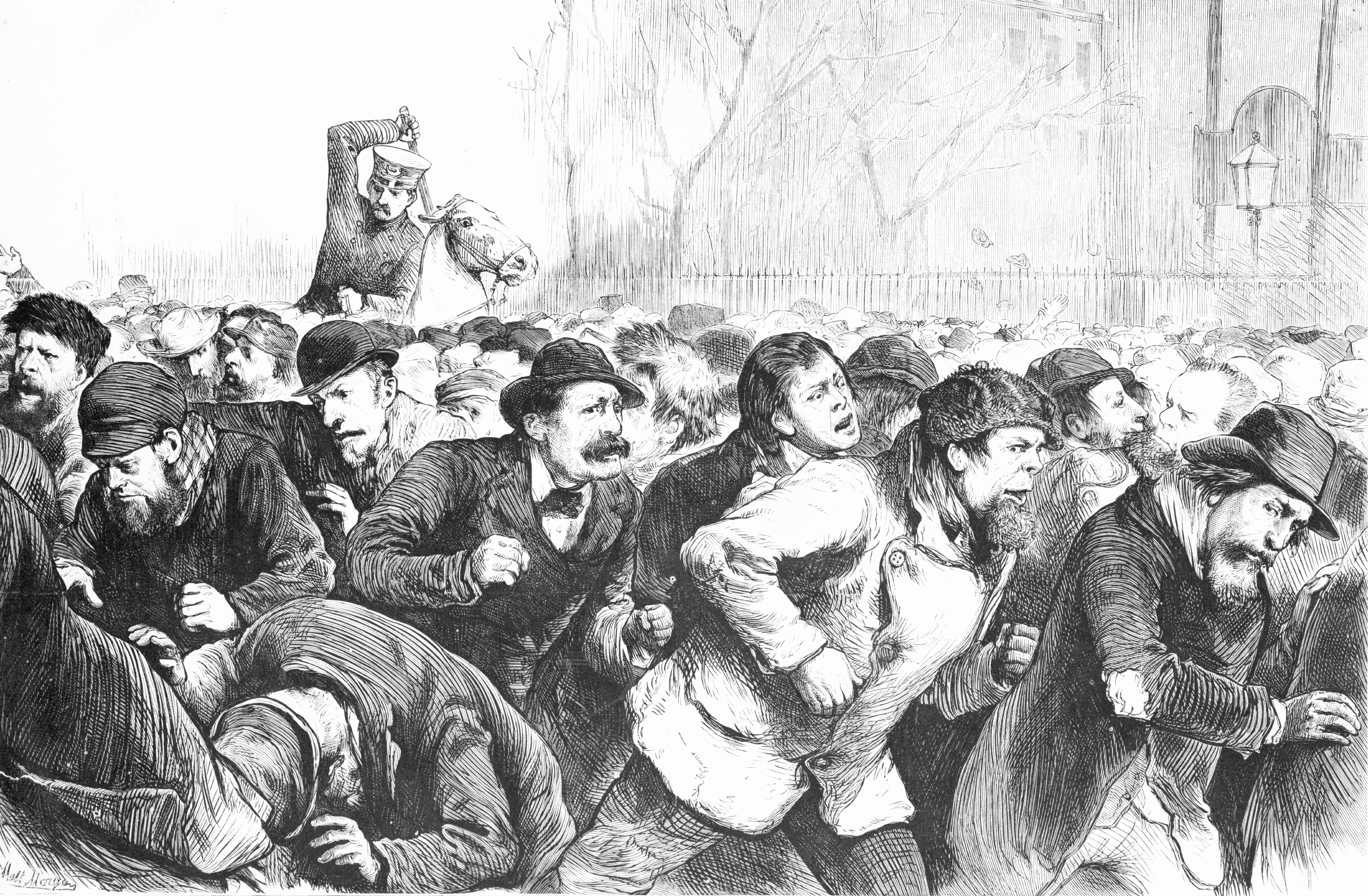
New York City police using force to remove rioting protesters in Tompkins Square Park, 1874

=== Long Depression ===
Starting with the adoption of the gold standard in Britain and the United States, the Long Depression (1873–1896) was longer than what is now referred to as the Great Depression, but shallower in some sectors. Many who lived through it regarded it to have been worse than the 1930s depression at times. It was known as "the Great Depression" until the 1930s.

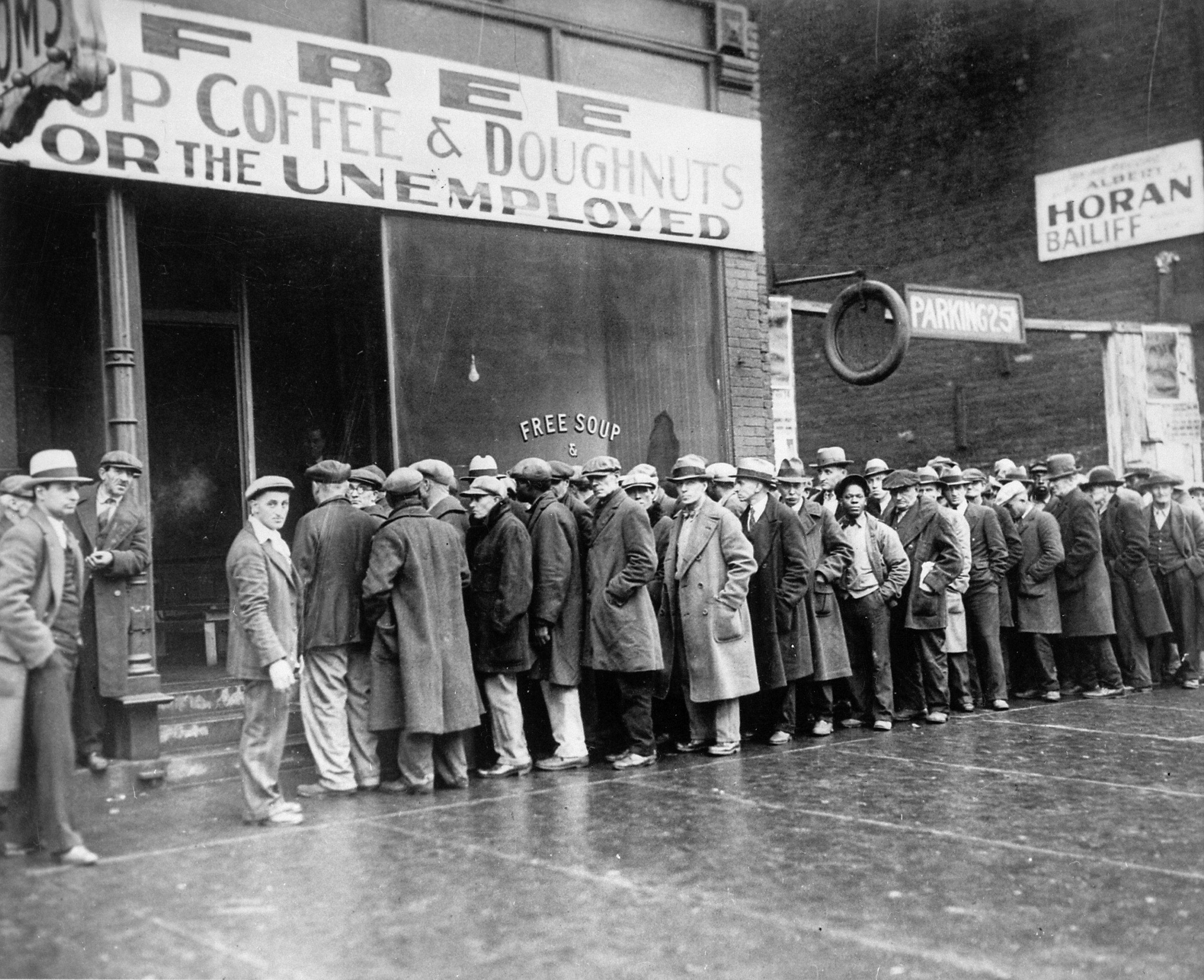
Unemployed men queued outside a depression soup kitchen opened in Chicago, Illinois by infamous gangster Al Capone, February 1931

=== Great Depression ===
The Great Depression of the 1930s affected most national economies in the world. This depression is generally considered to have begun with the Wall Street crash of 1929, and the crisis quickly spread to other national economies. Between 1929 and 1933, the gross national product of the United States decreased by 33% while the rate of unemployment increased to 25% (with industrial unemployment alone rising to approximately 35% – U.S. employment was still over 25% agricultural).

A long-term effect of the Great Depression was the departure of every major currency from the gold standard, although the initial impetus for this was World War II (see Bretton Woods Accord).

=== Greek depression ===
Beginning in 2009, Greece sank into a recession spurred by the Greek government-debt crisis that became a depression. The country saw an almost 20% drop in economic output, and unemployment soared to near 25%. Greece's high amounts of sovereign debt precipitated the crisis, and the poor performance of its economy after the introduction of severe austerity measures slowed the entire eurozone's recovery. Greece's troubles led to discussions about its departure from the eurozone.

=== Post-communism depression ===
The economic crisis in the 1990s that struck former members of the Soviet Union was almost twice as intense as the Great Depression in the countries of Western Europe and the United States in the 1930s. Average standards of living registered a catastrophic fall in the early 1990s in many parts of the former Eastern Bloc, most notably in post-Soviet states. Even before Russia's financial crisis of 1998, Russia's GDP was half of what it had been in the early 1990s. Some populations are still poorer today than they were in 1989 (e.g. Ukraine, Moldova, Serbia, Caucasus, Central Asia). The collapse of the Soviet planned economy and the transition to a market economy resulted in catastrophic declines in GDP of about 45% from 1990 to 1996 and poverty in the region had increased more than tenfold.

Finnish economists refer to the Finnish economic decline during and after the breakup of the Soviet Union (1989–1994) as a great depression (suuri lama). However, the depression was multicausal, with its severity compounded by a coincidence of multiple sudden external shocks, including loss of Soviet trade, the savings and loan crisis and early 1990s recession in the West, with the internal overheating that had been brewing throughout the 1980s. Liberalization had resulted in the so-called "casino economy". Persistent structural and monetary policy problems had not been solved, leaving the economy vulnerable to even mild external shocks. The depression had lasting effects: the Finnish markka was floated and was eventually replaced by the euro in 1999, ending decades of government control of the economy, but also high, persistent unemployment.

== Other depressions ==
Though popular Marxism may see economic depression as an inevitable disease of capitalist bourgeois systems, Chang Kyung-Sup diagnoses the phenomenon as eventually emerging under state socialism.

=== Global ===
The late 1910s and early 1920s were marked by an economic depression that unraveled in particularly catastrophic circumstances: World War I (1914 to 1918) and its aftermath led to a global nosedive in commodities that ruined many developing nations, while servicemen returning from the trenches faced high unemployment as businesses failed, unable to transition into a peacetime economy. Also, the Spanish flu pandemic of 1918–20 brought economic activity to a standstill as even more people became incapacitated. Most developed countries had mostly recovered by 1921–1922, however Germany saw its economy crippled until 1923–1924 because of the German hyperinflation crisis of 1921 to 1923.

The 1973 oil crisis, coupled with the rising costs of maintenance of the welfare state in most countries led to a recession between 1973 and 1975, followed by a period of almost minimal growth and rising inflation and unemployment. The 1980–1982 recession marked the end of the period.

The U.S. savings & loans crisis of 1986 to 1995 and the leveraged buyout crisis of the 1980s led to a severe depression in mid-to-late 1989, causing a recession in 1990–1991 (also fueled by the oil-price crisis), whose effects lasted as late as 1994. This downturn is more remembered for its political effects: British Prime Minister Margaret Thatcher had to resign in November 1990; and while his approval ratings exceeded 60%, U.S. President George H. W. Bush lost the 1992 election to Bill Clinton in the wake of the domestic malady marked by depression and increasing urban decay.

In 2005, the persistent oil-price rises and economic overheating caused by deregulation led to a gradual deterioration of the world economy, with inflation and unemployment rising as growth slowed: The housing bubble in the U.S. burst in 2007, and the American economy slipped into a recession. This, in turn, provoked the failure of many prominent financial institutions throughout 2008, most notably Lehman Brothers, leading to the loss of millions of jobs.

=== Regional ===
Several Latin American countries experience severe economic downturns in the 1980s: by the Kehoe and Prescott definition of a great depression as at least one year with output 20% below trend, Argentina, Brazil, Chile, Mexico, and Peru experienced great depressions in the 1980s, and Argentina experienced another between 1998 and 2002. South American countries fell once again into this situation in the early-to-mid 2010s.

The Kehoe and Prescott definition also applies to the economic performance of New Zealand from 1974 to 1992 and of Switzerland from 1973 to the present, although this designation for Switzerland has proven controversial.

From 1980 to 2000, Sub-Saharan Africa broadly suffered a fall in absolute income-levels.

From 2018, Turkey experienced a crisis known as the Great Turkish Depression.

== See also ==
- Economic collapse
- Great Recession
- L-shaped recession
- List of recessions
- List of recessions in the United States
- Recession
- Stagflation
