= The World Set Free =

1914 novel by H.G. Wells

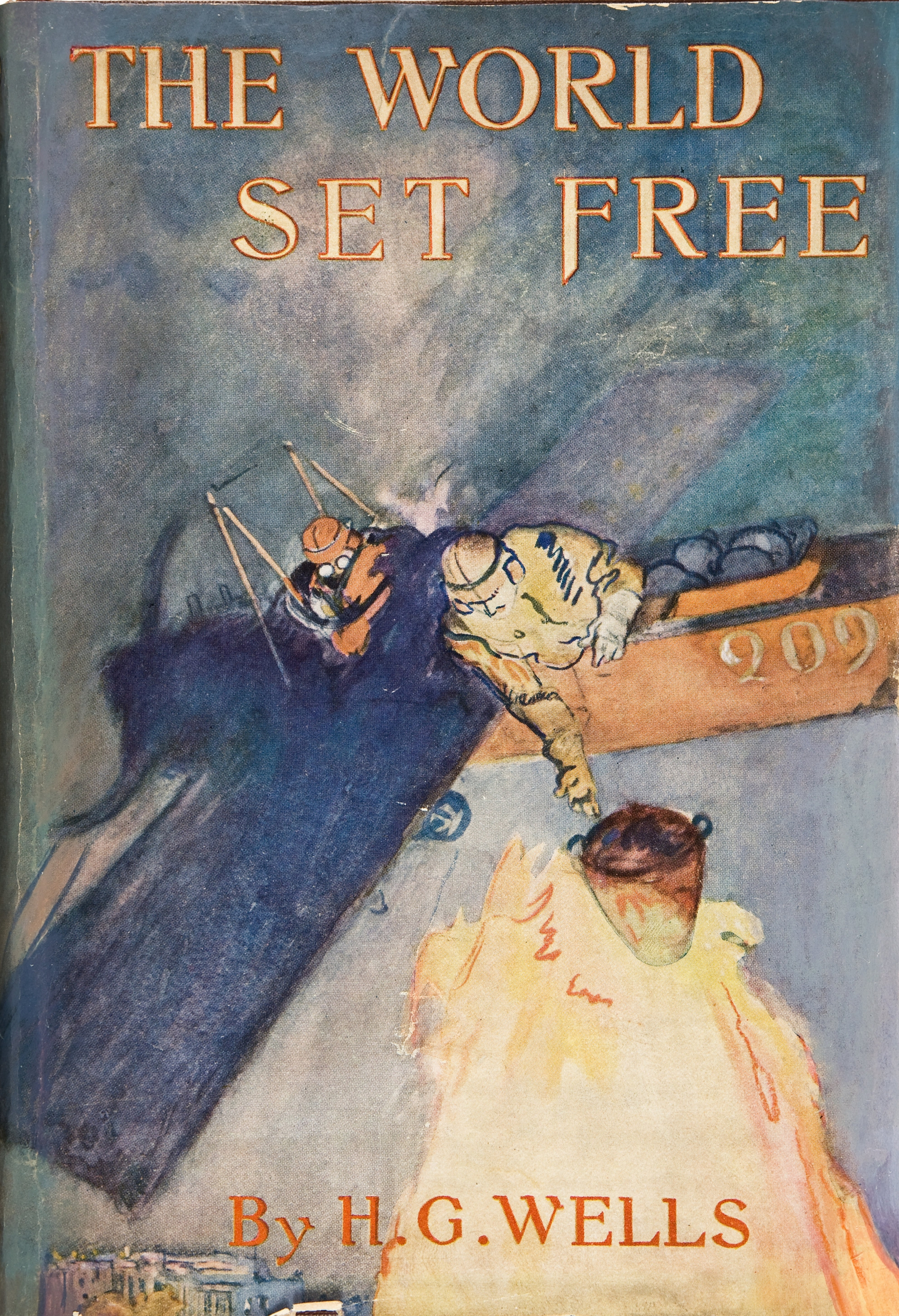
- First US edition
- Author: H. G. Wells
- Original title: The World Set Free: A Story of Mankind
- Language: English
- Published: 1914
- Publisher: Macmillan & Co. (UK); E. P. Dutton (US)
- Publication place: United Kingdom
- Media type: Print (hardback & paperback)
- Pages: 286
- Text: The World Set Free at Wikisource

The World Set Free is a novel written in 1913 and published in 1914 by H. G. Wells. The book is based on a prediction of a more destructive and uncontrollable sort of weapon than the world has yet seen. It had appeared first in serialised form with a different ending as A Prophetic Trilogy, consisting of three books: A Trap to Catch the Sun, The Last War in the World and The World Set Free.

The book was read by Leo Szilard in 1932 and aided his conception of the actual nuclear bomb.

== Plot ==
A frequent theme of Wells's work, as in his 1901 nonfiction book Anticipations, was the history of humans' mastery of power and energy through technological advance, seen as a determinant of human progress. The novel begins: "The history of mankind is the history of the attainment of external power. Man is the tool-using, fire-making animal. ... Always down a lengthening record, save for a set-back ever and again, he is doing more." (Many of the ideas Wells develops here found a fuller development when he wrote The Outline of History in 1918–1919.) The novel is dedicated "To Frederick Soddy's Interpretation of Radium", a volume published in 1909.

The war takes place in 1956, with both sides possessing nuclear weapons.

Scientists of the time were well aware that the slow natural radioactive decay of elements like radium continues for thousands of years, and that while the rate of energy release is negligible, the total amount released is huge. Wells used this as the basis for his story. In his fiction,

The problem which was already being mooted by such scientific men as Ramsay, Rutherford, and Soddy, in the very beginning of the twentieth century, the problem of inducing radio-activity in the heavier elements and so tapping the internal energy of atoms, was solved by a wonderful combination of induction, intuition, and luck by Holsten so soon as the year 1933.

Wells's "atomic bombs" have no more force than ordinary high explosive and are rather primitive devices detonated by a "bomb-thrower" biting off "a little celluloid stud". They consist of "lumps of pure Carolinum" that induce "a blazing continual explosion" whose half-life is seventeen days, so that it is "never entirely exhausted", so that "to this day the battle-fields and bomb fields of that frantic time in human history are sprinkled with radiant matter, and so centres of inconvenient rays."

Never before in the history of warfare had there been a continuing explosive; indeed, up to the middle of the twentieth century the only explosives known were combustibles whose explosiveness was due entirely to their instantaneousness; and these atomic bombs which science burst upon the world that night were strange even to the men who used them.

Wells observes:

Certainly it seems now that nothing could have been more obvious to the people of the earlier twentieth century than the rapidity with which war was becoming impossible. And as certainly they did not see it. They did not see it until the atomic bombs burst in their fumbling hands [...] All through the nineteenth and twentieth centuries the amount of energy that men were able to command was continually increasing. Applied to warfare that meant that the power to inflict a blow, the power to destroy, was continually increasing [...] There was no increase whatever in the ability to escape [...] Destruction was becoming so facile that any little body of malcontents could use it [...] Before the last war began it was a matter of common knowledge that a man could carry about in a handbag an amount of latent energy sufficient to wreck half a city.

Wells viewed war as the inevitable result of the Modern State; the introduction of atomic energy in a world divided resulted in the collapse of society. The only possibilities remaining were "either the relapse of mankind to agricultural barbarism from which it had emerged so painfully or the acceptance of achieved science as the basis of a new social order." Wells's theme of world government is presented as a solution to the threat of nuclear weapons.

From the first they had to see the round globe as one problem; it was impossible any longer to deal with it piece by piece. They had to secure it universally from any fresh outbreak of atomic destruction, and they had to ensure a permanent and universal pacification.

The devastation of the war leads the French ambassador at Washington, Leblanc, to summon world leaders to a conference at Brissago, where Britain's King Egbert sets an example by abdicating in favor of a world state. Such is the state of the world's exhaustion that the effective coup of this council ("Never, of course, had there been so provisional a government. It was of an extravagant illegality.") is resisted only in a few places. The defeat of Serbia's King Ferdinand Charles and his attempt to destroy the council and seize control of the world is narrated in some detail.

Brought to its senses, humanity creates a utopian order along Wellsian lines in short order. Atomic energy has solved the problem of work. In the new order "the majority of our population consists of artists."

The World Set Free concludes with a chapter recounting the reflections of one of the new order's sages, Marcus Karenin, during his last days. Karenin argues that knowledge and power, not love, are the essential vocation of humanity, and that "There is no absolute limit to either knowledge or power."

== Influence on invention of nuclear weapons ==
Wells's knowledge of atomic physics came from reading books by William Ramsay, Ernest Rutherford, and Frederick Soddy; the last discovered the fission of uranium. Soddy's book Wealth, Virtual Wealth and Debt praises The World Set Free.

Leo Szilard, a Hungarian a generation younger than Wells, grew up reading and enjoying the works of Wells, both fiction and nonfiction, and became a nuclear physicist. In 1929 he met Wells, who urged him to discover new sources of energy which could bring humankind to the stars. The question occupied Szilard's thoughts in the years thereafter, and in 1932 he read and was disturbed by The World Set Free. The following year, Szilard saw a newspaper article in which Rutherford dismissed the idea that particle acceleration could ever generate energy. Szilard was irritated by Rutherford's arrogant rejection of the future of a yet undeveloped field, and a few days later, while on a walk, the idea of nuclear chain reaction came to him. He filed for a patent on the mechanism in 1934, but remembering The World Set Free, treated the subject cautiously. In a volume published in 1968, Szilard wrote: "Knowing what [a chain reaction] would mean—and I knew because I had read H.G. Wells—I did not want this patent to become public."

== See also ==
- archive.org (sign up to access material): The World Set Free
- The Shape of Things to Come
- The World State
- Dirty bomb
