= Arabic and Islamic names of Moon craters =

Arabic and Islamic names of Moon craters

- Abulfeda (crater)
- Abul Wafa (crater)
- Al-Bakri (crater)
- Al-Biruni (crater)

== See also ==
- List of Arabic star names
