= Ctesibius (crater) =

Crater on the Moon

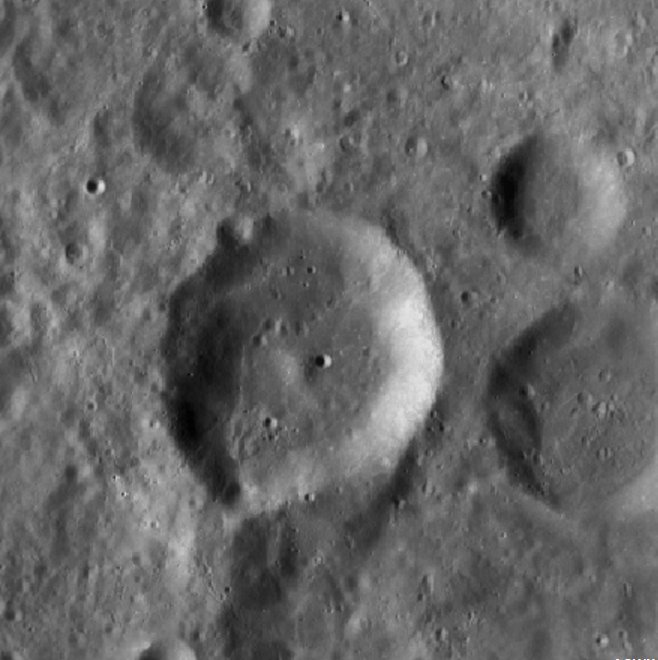
- LRO image
- Coordinates: 0.8°N 118.7°E
- Diameter: 32.10 km (19.95 mi)
- Depth: 2.5 km (1.6 mi)
- Colongitude: 242° at sunrise
- Eponym: Ctesibius

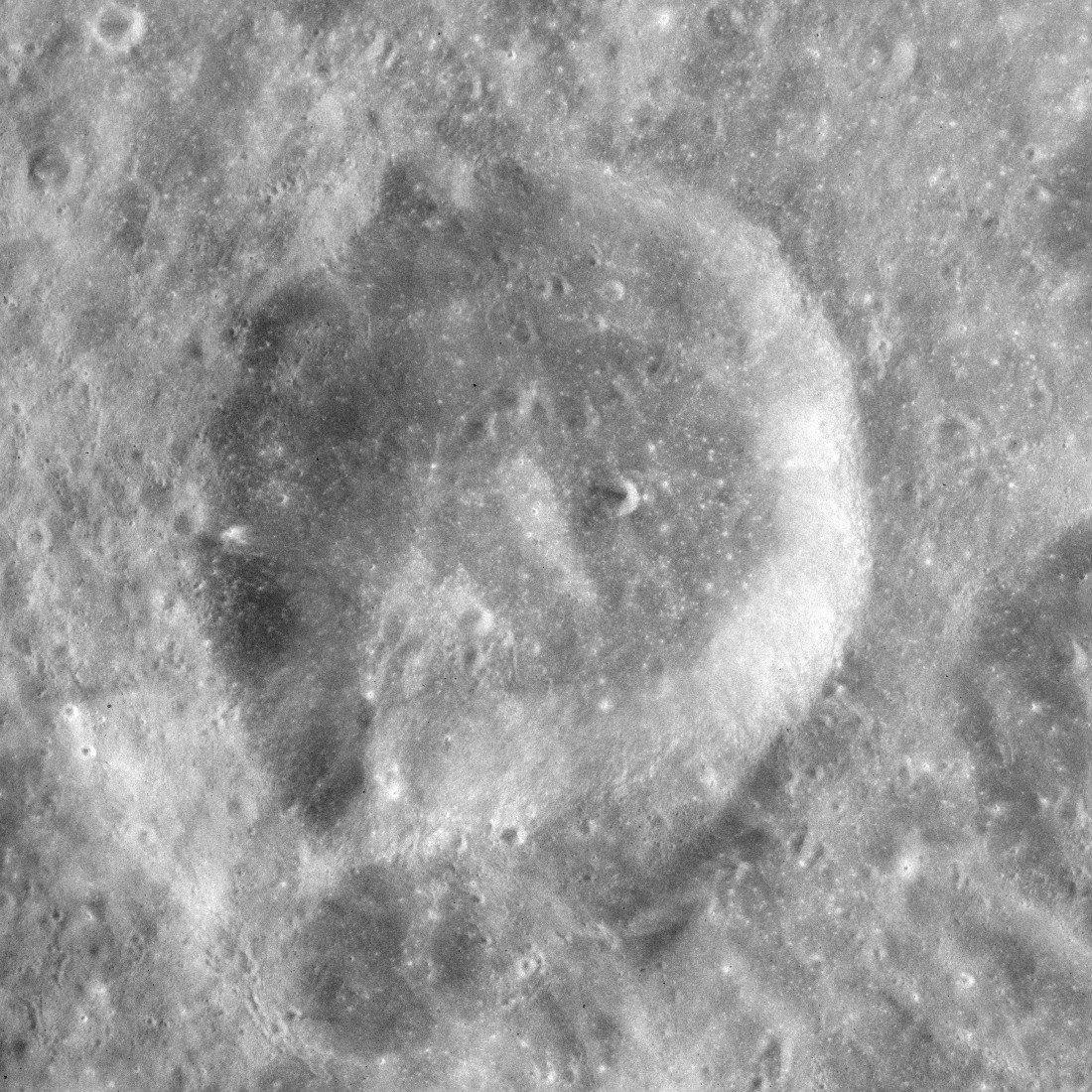
Apollo 16 image

Ctesibius is a small lunar impact crater that is located near the equator, on the far side of the Moon. It lies between the larger crater Abul Wáfa to the west and the slightly smaller Heron to the east.

The outer wall of Ctesibius is wide and sharp-edged, with little erosion. A low ridge is attached to the southern rim, and curves to the south-southeast. At the center of the relatively flat interior is a low ridge. Faint traces of ray material lies across the western floor and rim from Necho to the southeast.

This formation is named after the ancient Greek-Egyptian inventor Ctesibius (unkn-c. 100 B.C.), who was distinguished for his inventions in hydrolics. Its designation was officially adopted by the International Astronomical Union in 1976.
