= Ruth Pirret =

Scottish scientist working in radioactivity

- Born: 24 July 1874; Glasgow, Scotland
- Died: 19 June 1939; London, England
- Education: University of Glasgow
- Known for: first woman to graduate with a BSc from the University of Glasgow research contribution to the understanding of radioactive decay
- Awards: Advanced Practical Physiology (University of Glasgow)
- Scientific career
- Workplaces: British Admiralty; University of Glasgow; Ashburne House Hall

Ruth Pirret (24 July 1874 – 19 June 1939) was a Scottish scientist working in the field of radioactivity and the first woman to graduate from the University of Glasgow with a BSc. She was the second woman to register as a research student at the university after Louise McIlroy. Her research contributed to the understanding of radioactive decay.

== Biography ==
Pirret was born on 24 July 1874 to Violet Brown and Reverend David Pirret in Milton, Glasgow.

In 1892 she matriculated at the University of Glasgow, one of the first women to do so. While a student she won eight prizes including the Advanced Practical Physiology. She graduated with a BSc in Pure Science on 12 April 1898, the first woman at the university to graduate with a BSc.

After graduation she taught at schools in Kilmacolm and Newcastle.

She returned to the University of Glasgow in 1909, registering to be research assistant, only the second woman to do so at the university. She researched the chemistry of radioactive elements with Frederick Soddy in 1909, developing the disintegration theory of radioactivity and publishing 'The ratio between uranium and radium in minerals'.

During World War I she researched corrosion of boilers in marine engines for the British Admiralty.

She became Vice Warden of Ashburne House Hall in Manchester before moving to London where she shared a house with sister Mary Margaret Pirret (1876-1942), a physician.

She died in London on 19 June 1939.
