= Ada Hitchins =

English nuclear chemist (1891–1972)

Ada Florence Remfry Hitchins
- Born: 26 June 1891; Tavistock, Devon, England
- Died: 4 January 1972 (aged 80); Bristol, England
- Other name: Mrs. John R. Stephens
- Education: University of Glasgow
- Awards: Carnegie Scholar (1914–1915)
- Scientific career
- Workplaces: University of Glasgow; University of Aberdeen; Oxford University; Mining and Geological Department of the Colonial Government of Kenya

Ada Florence Remfry Hitchins (26 June 1891 – 4 January 1972) was the principal research assistant of British chemist Frederick Soddy, who won the Nobel prize in 1921 for work on radioactive elements and the theory of isotopes. Hitchins isolated samples from uranium ores, taking precise and accurate measurements of atomic mass that provided the first experimental evidence for the existence of different isotopes. She also helped to discover the element protactinium, which Dmitri Mendeleev had predicted should occur in the periodic table between uranium and thorium.

== Education ==
Ada Hitchins was born on 26 June 1891 in Tavistock, Devon, England, the daughter of William Hedley Hitchins, a supervisor of customs and excise, and his wife Annie Sarah Pearsons. The family lived for a time in Campbeltown, Scotland, where Hitchins attended high school, graduating in 1909. From there, she went to the University of Glasgow, obtaining her bachelor's degree in science, with honors, in 1913. She was awarded prizes in botany and geology, as well as being accorded special distinction for her work in chemistry.

== A career disrupted by war and peace ==
In her final year at the University of Glasgow, Hitchins began to work with Frederick Soddy. When he moved to the University of Aberdeen as the Chair of Chemistry in 1914, Hitchins and another assistant, John A. Cranston, accompanied him. At Aberdeen, Hitchins was a Carnegie Research Scholar, receiving a one-year appointment and monetary award given to a graduate of a Scottish institution for research and study by American philanthropist Andrew Carnegie.

Expectations that Soddy would establish a thriving research center at Aberdeen were disrupted by World War I, as male students became soldiers, and women students were encouraged to graduate from accelerated courses so as to fill positions in industry and government. Hitchins was drafted to work in the Admiralty Steel Analysis Laboratories in 1916. After the war, women workers were displaced from their jobs by returning soldiers. Hitchins, released from the Admiralty, was able to find work at a Sheffield steel works.

In 1921, Frederick Soddy, then at the University of Oxford, obtained funding to rehire Hitchins as a technical assistant. He had recently received the Nobel prize for his work on radioactivity and isotopes. In 1922, Hitchins became his private research assistant. She continued to work with him until 1927, when she emigrated to Kenya to be nearer to her family.

== Radioactive research ==
Hitchins worked with Soddy over a period of 15 years, which included his most productive periods of achievement. She was his primary research assistant, and the only person to work with him for a long period of time. Her careful preparation of radioactive materials, and her painstaking experimental work with uranium, protactinium, and lead isotopes, made crucial contributions to the research for which Soddy received the Nobel Prize.

=== Uranium and ionium ===
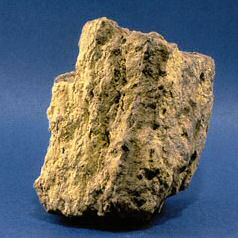
Uranium ore

When Hitchins first worked with Soddy, researchers were still searching for new chemical elements, and isotopes were not yet understood. As early as 1904, researchers had hypothesized that the decay of uranium resulted in the creation of radium, but how this occurred was not clear. In 1907, the American radiochemist Bertram Boltwood had isolated what he believed to be a new intermediate element in the decay chain between uranium and radium, "ionium". Researchers eventually determined that ionium was actually an isotope of thorium, ^{230}Th.

Soddy asked Hitchins to investigate ionium. She selectively extracted uranium from ore samples to create purified uranium preparations and established a half-life for ionium. Her research also showed that there was a steady rate of increase in the amount of radium in her uranium solutions, the first direct experimental evidence that radium was formed by the decay of uranium. Her results were published in 1915.

=== Atomic weight of "thorium" lead ===
Hitchins helped to determine the atomic weight of lead based on measurements of radioactive ores, work that was important in developing an understanding of isotopes. The samples of distilled lead which Hitchins prepared from Ceylon thorite were used by Frederick Soddy and supplied by him to Otto Hönigschmid, who did important work confirming that the atomic weight of thorium lead is higher than that of common lead.

Soddy indicated that Hitchins also worked on the actual analyses, in his published report of 1917: "According to analyses by Miss A. F. R. Hitchins and myself, the 20 kilos of selected thorite worked upon contained 0-4 per cent, of lead, 57 per cent, of thorium, 1-03 per cent, of uranium, and 0-5 c.c. of helium per gram." This work proved that atomic weight was not a constant. Chemically pure elements could be mixtures of isotopes with differing atomic weights.

=== Actinium and protactinium ===
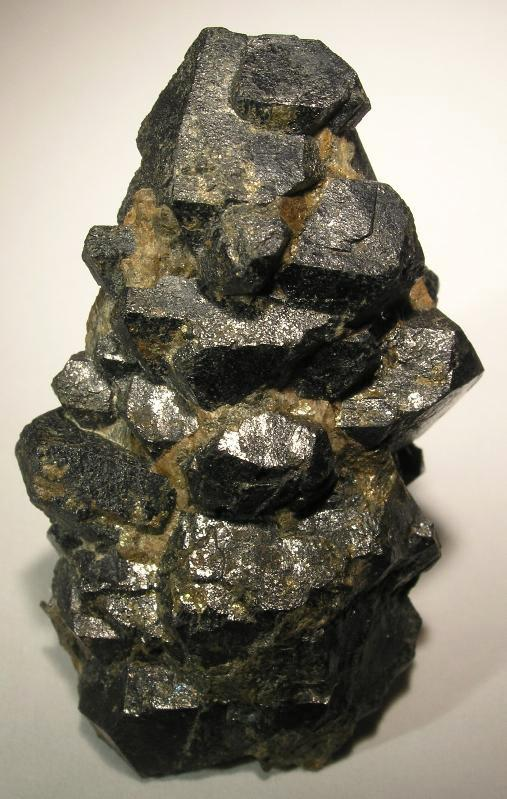
Uraninite ore, a source of protactinium

John A. Cranston, who had also come from Glasgow to Aberdeen with Soddy as a research assistant, was drafted in March 1915. Hitchins continued Cranston's research before she herself was drafted for war work in 1916. This research resulted in the successful identification of a new element in the decay chain between uranium-235 and actinium, later named protactinium. The discovery of protactinium completed the early version of the periodic table proposed by Dmitri Mendeleev, who predicted the existence of an element between thorium and uranium in 1871. The same isotope, ^{231}Pa, was independently discovered around the same time by Otto Hahn and Lise Meitner.

Soddy and Cranston published their paper in 1918. Although Hitchins was not included as a co-author, Soddy gave Hitchins significant credit for the contributions she had made to the research:

The experiments were undertaken when the course of the disintegration of uranium and its connection with radium was quite obscure, but the experiments afford valuable data, which has never been properly discussed in the light of recent discoveries, on the possible modes of origin of actinium. With regard to the new work, in the absence of one of us on military service since 1915, the experiments were continued for a time by Miss Ada Hitchens, [sic] B.Sc, Carnegie Research Scholar, until she also left to engage in war duties. Her valuable assistance has contributed very materially to the definiteness of the conclusions that it has been possible to arrive at.

=== Measuring radioactivity ===
In her early work with Soddy, Hitchins helped to prepare radium standards for the calibration of gold-leaf electroscopes, used to measure radioactivity.

After she returned to work with Soddy in 1921, Hitchins further refined measurements of the half-life of ionium, and determined ratios of thorium isotopes in mineral samples. She also developed methods for extracting radioactive elements from minerals and ores.

Soddy wrote of her:

I regard Miss Hitchins as an exceedingly accomplished chemist with a wide knowledge and experience of difficult chemical and mineral analysis. It is much to her credit that in her work with extremely rare and difficultly obtainable materials she has never had any accident or lost any of the material.

== Later life ==
In 1927 Hitchins moved to Kenya, to join other members of her family who had emigrated there. Frederick Soddy wrote to the British Colonial Office, recommending her for a government position. Hitchins was employed as a Government Assayer and Chemist in the Mining and Geological Department of the Colonial Government until 1946. After her retirement, the department's annual report said of her that "she filled the post of Chemist and Assayer gaining an outstanding reputation for accuracy and complete reliability, and her loss was keenly felt by the mining industry."

In 1946, Hitchins married a farmer, John Ross Stephens (also spelled Rees).

Hitchins died in Bristol, England, on January 4, 1972.
