= Recession of 1953 =

Economic downturn in the United States

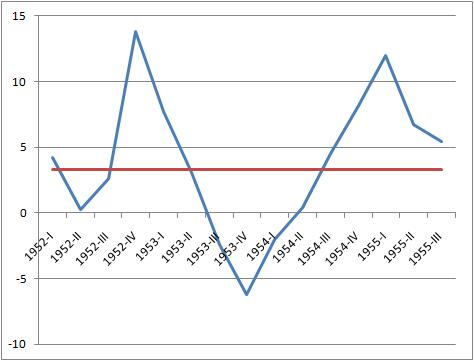
GDP growth in the U.S., 1951–1955 Percent change from preceding period in real GDP (annualized; seasonally adjusted) Average GDP growth (1947–2009)

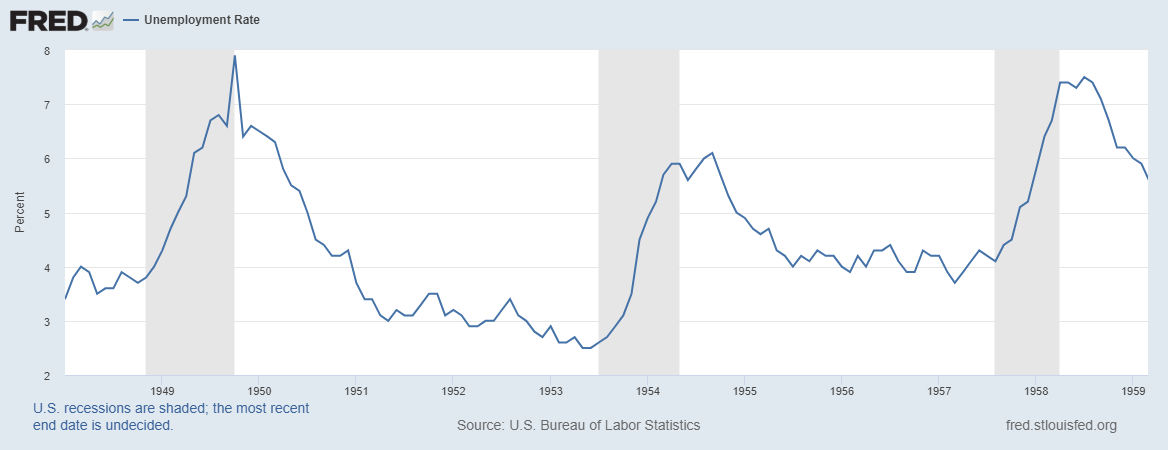
U.S. unemployment rate, 1948–1959

The recession of 1953 was a period of economic downturn in the United States that began in the second quarter of 1953 and lasted until the first quarter of 1954. The total recession cost roughly $56 billion. It has been described by James L. Sundquist, a staff member of the Bureau of the Budget and speechwriter for President Harry S. Truman, as "relatively mild and brief." The 1953 recession is an example of a V-shaped recession, with a sharp three quarter decline that is followed by a sharp recovery.

== Causes ==
The recession occurred because of a combination of events during the earliest parts of the 1950s. In 1951, there was a post-Korean War inflationary period and later in the year more funds were transferred into national security. Further inflation was expected into 1952 and the Federal Reserve set in motion restrictive monetary policy.

The expected inflation never happened, but the policy was still implemented. During this time, the Treasury also lengthened the maturity of the national debt and pursued flexible interest rate policies. Alongside these policies, the Treasury also began to do debt refunding, which only increased interest rates further and subsequently issued a low percentage bond. The Federal Reserve recognized the increasing interest rates and decided to allow more reserves to be available. This worked, but interest rates plummeted sending the U.S. into a demand-driven recession of output and employment. GDP declined because of government spending and investment.

== See also ==
- Lists of recessions
