= Ergosophy =

Ergosophy is a term coined by the scientist Frederick Soddy, in the early 1920s, and refers to aspects of energy in relation to human existence and energy measurement as in (Ergs). Soddy's aim was to apply science theories and ideas and move the human understanding of work beyond the restrictions of management theory into a new theory of energy economics.

Frederick Soddy first used the term in his book on work and economics: The Role of Money.

== See also ==
- Ecological economics
