= Abul Wáfa (crater) =

Lunar impact crater

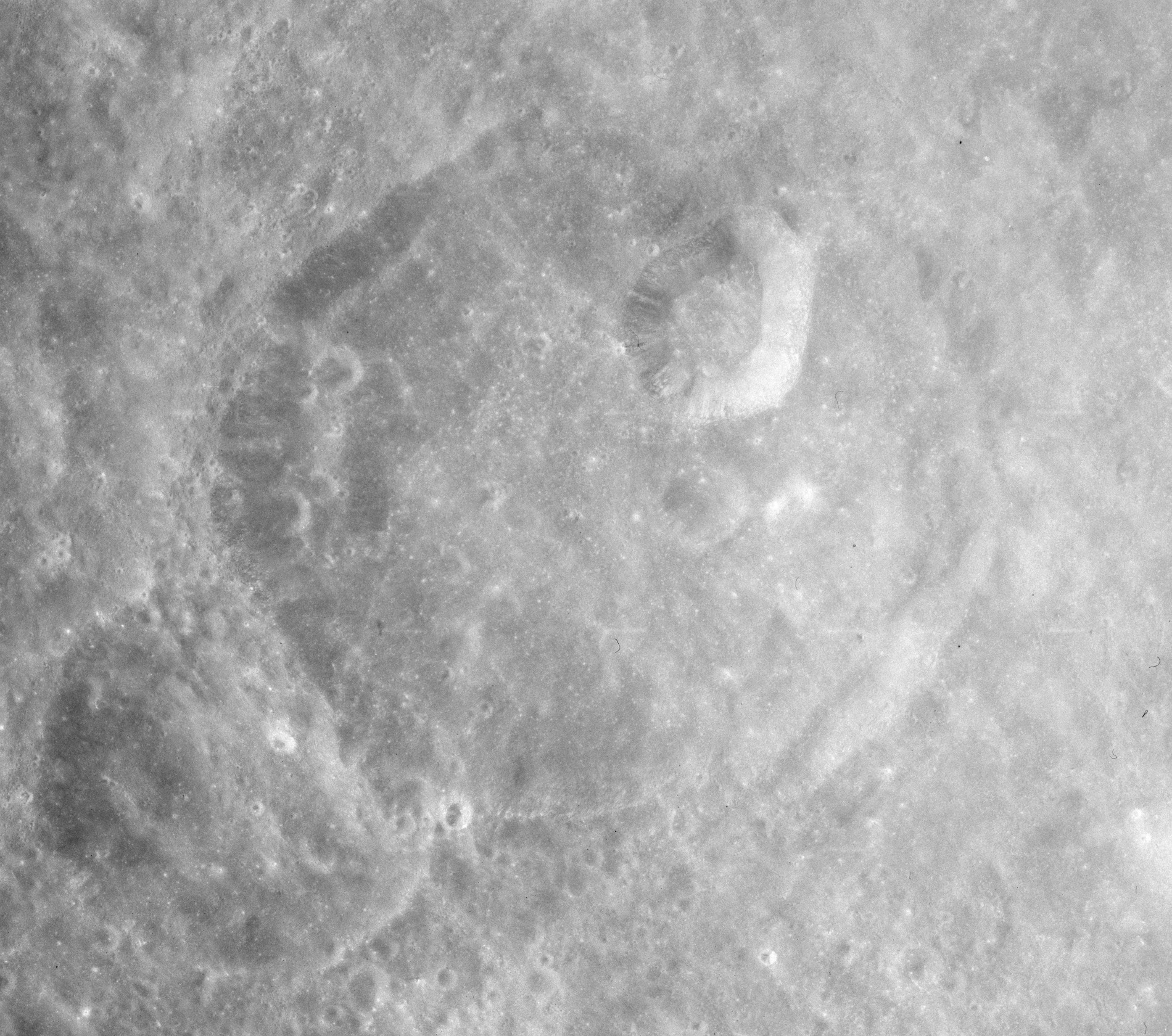
- Apollo 16 Mapping camera image
- Coordinates: 1.0°N 116.6°E
- Diameter: 54.18 km (33.67 mi)
- Depth: 4.05 km (2.52 mi)
- Colongitude: 244° at sunrise
- Eponym: Abul Wáfa

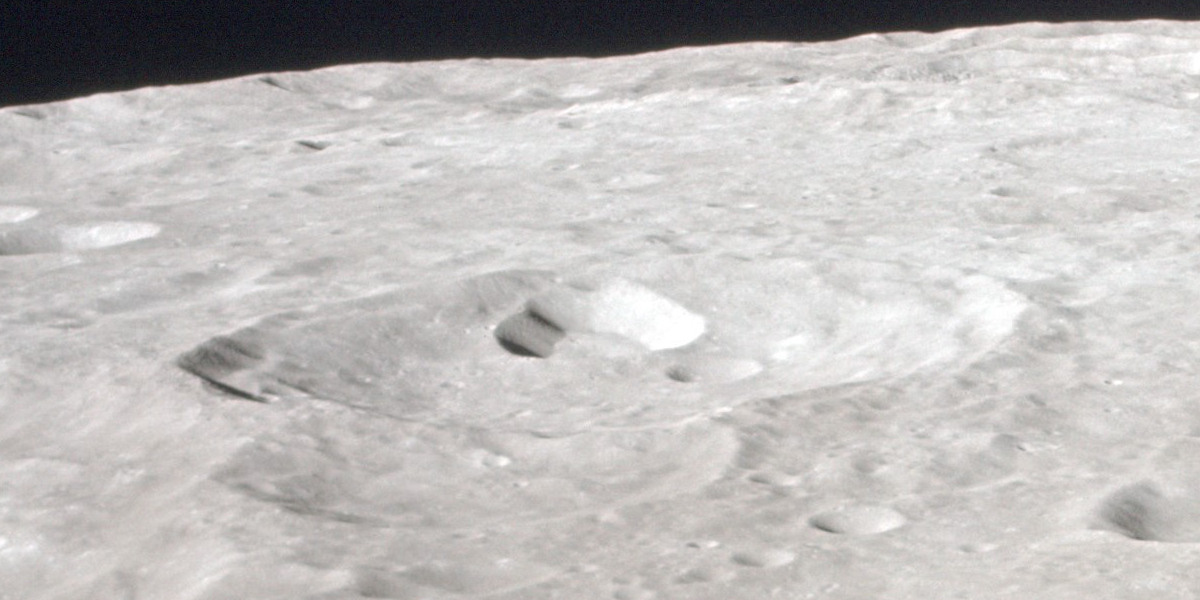
Oblique view from Apollo 12

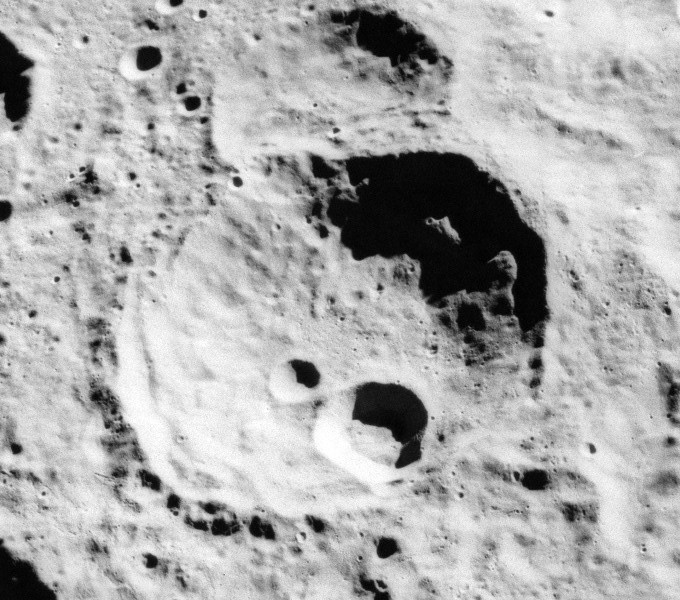
Oblique view from Apollo 16

Abul Wafa is an impact crater located near the lunar equator on the far side of the Moon. To the east are the crater pair Ctesibius and Heron. In the northeast lies the larger crater King, and to the southwest is Vesalius.

The perimeter of this crater somewhat resembles a rounded diamond shape. The rim and inner walls are rounded from impact erosion, and have lost some definition. There are ledges around most of the inner wall that may have once been terraces or slumped piles of scree.

A small but notable crater lies on the inner surface of the north rim of Abul Wáfa, and there is a small crater formation attached to the exterior southwest wall. The outer rim is relatively free of impacts, and the interior floor is marked only by a few small craterlets.

This feature is named after the Persian mathematician and astronomer Abu al-Wafa' Buzjani (940–998). It was officially incorporated into lunar nomenclature by the International Astronomical Union in 1970.

== Satellite craters ==
By convention these features are identified on lunar maps by placing the letter on the side of the crater midpoint that is closest to Abul Wáfa.

Abul Wáfa	Latitude	Longitude	Diameter
A	1.4° N	116.8° E	16 km
Q	0.2° N	115.7° E	30 km
