= Soddy (crater) =

Crater on the Moon

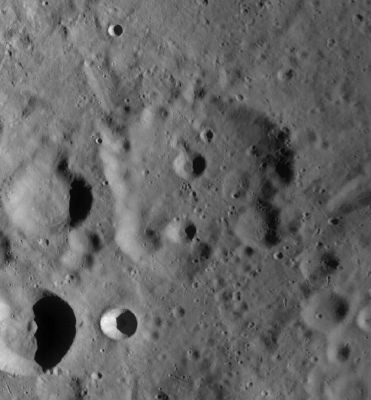
- LRO image
- Coordinates: 0.4°N 121.8°E
- Diameter: 42 km
- Depth: Unknown
- Colongitude: 239° at sunrise
- Eponym: Frederick Soddy

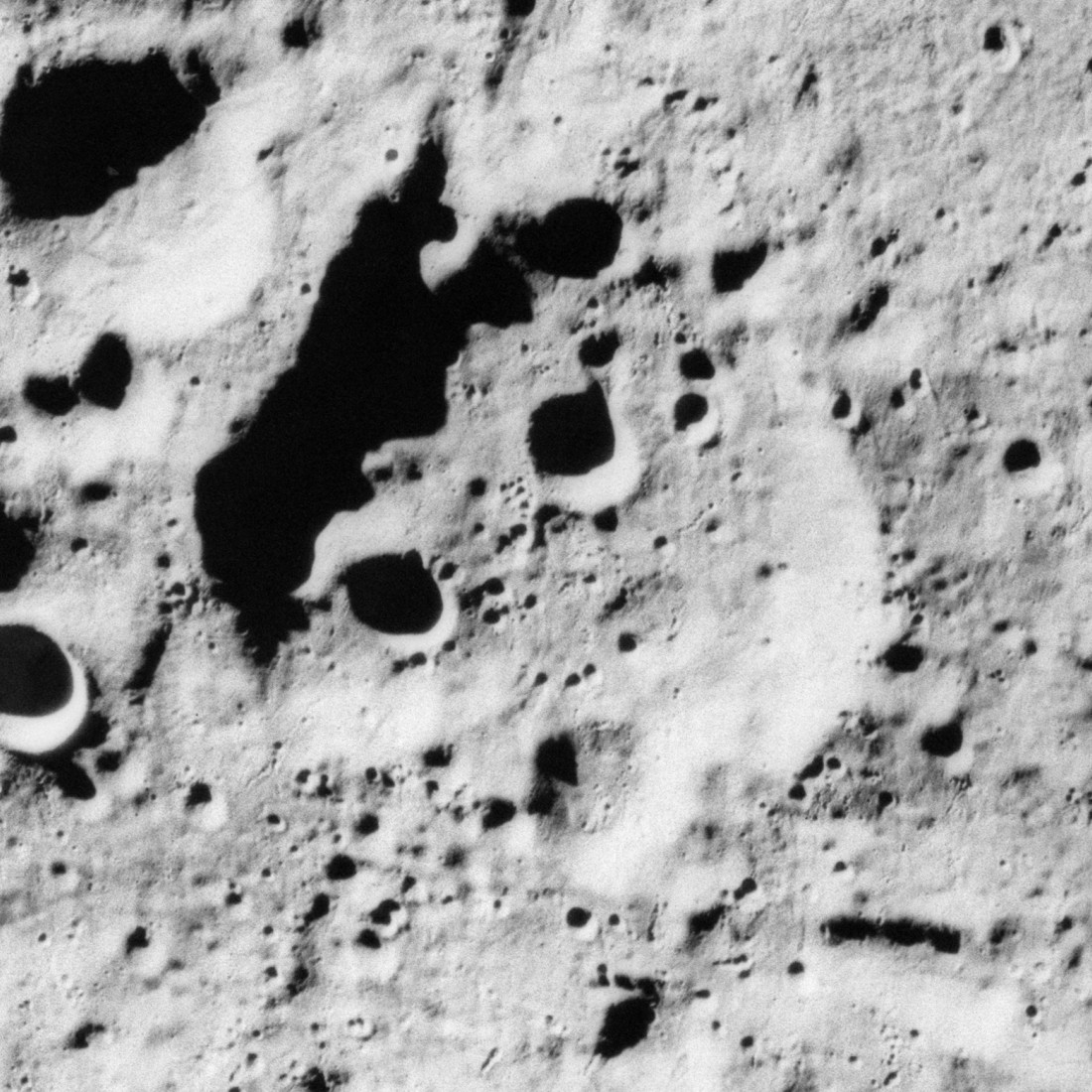
Apollo 16 image

Soddy is an eroded lunar impact crater lying on the far side of the Moon, invisible from the Earth, to the south-southeast of the prominent crater King. Material from the ray system surrounding King covers the sides and interior of Soddy. Less than one crater diameter to the west of Soddy is the smaller Heron.

The crater is named after the British physicist Frederick Soddy who was also a Nobel laureate.

This crater has been heavily worn and eroded, so that only a remnant of a crater depression survives. There are small craterlets along the rim edge to the southwest and southeast. The interior is uneven and almost indistinguishable from the surrounding terrain.

== Satellite craters ==
By convention these features are identified on lunar maps by placing the letter on the side of the crater midpoint that is closest to Soddy.

Soddy	Latitude	Longitude	Diameter
E	0.8° N	123.4° E	16 km
G	0.5° N	123.5° E	13 km
P	0.4° S	120.9° E	8 km
Q	0.5° S	120.2° E	24 km
