= Frederick Soddy =

English radiochemist (1877–1956)

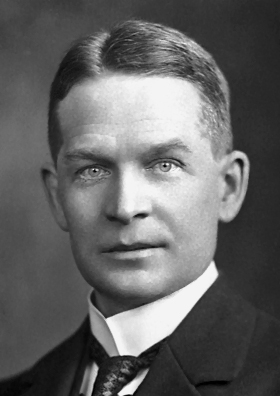
- Soddy in 1921
- Born: 2 September 1877; Eastbourne, Sussex, England
- Died: 22 September 1956 (aged 79); Brighton, Sussex, England
- Education: University of Wales; Merton College, Oxford
- Known for: Nuclear transmutation; Discovery of isotopes; Fajans and Soddy law; Thermoeconomics; Ergosophy; Soddy circles; Soddy's hexlet
- Spouse: Winifred Beilby
- Awards: Nobel Prize in Chemistry (1921); Soddy crater; Fellow of the Royal Society
- Scientific career
- Fields: Radiochemistry; Economics
- Workplaces: McGill University (1900–1903); University of Glasgow (1904–1914); University of Aberdeen (1914–1919); University of Oxford (1919–1936)

Frederick Soddy FRS (2 September 1877 – 22 September 1956) was an English radiochemist who explained, with Ernest Rutherford, that radioactivity is due to the transmutation of elements, now known to involve nuclear reactions. He also proved the existence of isotopes of certain radioactive elements. In 1921, he received the Nobel Prize in Chemistry "for his contributions to our knowledge of the chemistry of radioactive substances, and his investigations into the origin and nature of isotopes". Soddy was a polymath who mastered chemistry, nuclear physics, statistical mechanics, finance, and economics.

== Biography ==
Soddy was born at 6 Bolton Road, Eastbourne, England, the son of Benjamin Soddy, corn merchant, and his wife Hannah Green. He went to school at Eastbourne College, before going on to study at University College of Wales at Aberystwyth and at Merton College, Oxford, where he graduated in 1898 with first class honours in chemistry. He was a researcher at Oxford from 1898 to 1900.

== Scientific career ==
In 1900, he became a demonstrator in chemistry at McGill University in Montreal, Quebec, where he worked with Ernest Rutherford on radioactivity. He and Rutherford realized that the anomalous behaviour of radioactive elements was because they decayed into other elements. This decay also produced alpha, beta, and gamma radiation. When radioactivity was first discovered, no one was sure what the cause was. It needed careful work by Soddy and Rutherford to prove that atomic transmutation was in fact occurring.

In 1903, with Sir William Ramsay at University College London, Soddy showed that the decay of radium produced helium gas. In the experiment a sample of radium was enclosed in a thin-walled glass envelope sited within an evacuated glass bulb. After leaving the experiment running for a long period of time, a spectral analysis of the contents of the former evacuated space revealed the presence of helium. Later in 1907, Rutherford and Thomas Royds showed that the helium was first formed as positively charged nuclei of helium (He^{2+}) which were identical to alpha particles, which could pass through the thin glass wall but were contained within the surrounding glass envelope.

From 1904 to 1914, Soddy was a lecturer at the University of Glasgow. Ruth Pirret worked as his research assistant during this time. In May 1910 Soddy was elected a Fellow of the Royal Society. In 1914 he was appointed to a chair at the University of Aberdeen, where he worked on research related to World War I.

In 1913, Soddy showed that an atom moves lower in atomic number by two places on alpha emission, higher by one place on beta emission. This was discovered at about the same time by Kazimierz Fajans, and is known as the radioactive displacement law of Fajans and Soddy, a fundamental step toward understanding the relationships among families of radioactive elements. In 1913 Soddy also described the phenomenon in which a radioactive element may have more than one atomic mass though the chemical properties are identical. He named this concept isotope meaning "same place". The word was initially suggested to him by Margaret Todd. Later, J. J. Thomson showed that non-radioactive elements can also have multiple isotopes.

The work that Soddy and his research assistant Ada Hitchins did at Glasgow and Aberdeen showed that uranium decays to radium.

Soddy published The Interpretation of Radium (1909) and Atomic Transmutation (1953).

In 1918, working with the Scottish scientist John Arnold Cranston, he announced the discovery of an isotope of the element later named protactinium. This slightly post-dated its discovery by the Germans Lise Meitner and Otto Hahn; however, it is said their discovery was actually made in 1915 but its announcement was delayed due to Cranston's notes being locked away whilst on active service in the First World War.

In 1919, he moved to the University of Oxford as the first Dr. Lee's Professor of Chemistry, where, in the period up till 1936, he reorganized the laboratories and the syllabus in chemistry. He received the 1921 Nobel Prize in Chemistry for his research in radioactive decay and particularly for his formulation of the theory of isotopes.

In Soddy's 1922 paper "Radioactivity and the Evolution of the World" there is a section on Soddy's belief that knowledge in the form of myths had been passed down to the present day from an ancient, advanced civilisation.

His work and essays popularising the new understanding of radioactivity was the main inspiration for H. G. Wells's The World Set Free (1914), which features atomic bombs dropped from biplanes in a war set many years in the future. Wells's novel is also known as The Last War and imagines a peaceful world emerging from the chaos. In Wealth, Virtual Wealth and Debt Soddy praises Wells's The World Set Free. He also says that radioactive processes probably power the stars.

== Economics ==
In four books written from 1921 to 1934, Soddy carried on a "campaign for a radical restructuring of global monetary relationships", offering a perspective on economics rooted in physics – the laws of thermodynamics, in particular – and was "roundly dismissed as a crank". While most of his proposals – "to abandon the gold standard, let international exchange rates float, use federal surpluses and deficits as macroeconomic policy tools that could counter cyclical trends, and establish bureaus of economic statistics (including a consumer price index) in order to facilitate this effort" – are now conventional practice, his critique of fractional-reserve banking still "remains outside the bounds of conventional wisdom" although a recent paper by the IMF reinvigorated his proposals. Soddy wrote that financial debts grew exponentially at compound interest but the real economy was based on exhaustible stocks of fossil fuels. Energy obtained from the fossil fuels could not be used again. This criticism of economic growth is echoed by his intellectual heirs in the emergent field of ecological economics.

The New Palgrave Dictionary of Economics, an influential reference text in economics, recognized Soddy as a "reformer" for his works on monetary reforms.

== Political views ==
In Wealth, Virtual Wealth and Debt, Soddy cited the Protocols of the Learned Elders of Zion, which had been widely disseminated by Henry Ford in the United States, as evidence that the belief in a "financial conspiracy to enslave the world" was widespread at the time. He further wrote that "conscious conspiracy or not ... a corrupt monetary system strikes at the very life of the nation". Later in life he published a pamphlet Abolish Private Money, or Drown in Debt (1939).

The influence of his writing can be gauged, for example, in this quote from Ezra Pound:

Professor Frederick Soddy states that the Gold Standard monetary system has wrecked a scientific age! ... The world's bankers... have not been content to take their share of modern wealth production – great as it has been – but they have refused to allow the masses of mankind to receive theirs.

Though some activists have accused Soddy of anti-Semitism, some argue that among Soddy's friends and students were some Jews who held positive views of him.

== Descartes' theorem ==
He rediscovered Descartes' theorem in 1936 and published it as a poem, "The Kiss Precise", quoted at Problem of Apollonius. The kissing circles in this problem are sometimes known as Soddy circles.

== Honours and awards ==
He received the Nobel Prize in Chemistry in 1921 and the same year was elected member of the International Atomic Weights Committee. A small crater on the far side of the Moon as well as the radioactive uranium mineral soddyite are named after him. The author H. G. Wells dedicated his novel The World Set Free to Soddy's Interpretation of Radium (1909).

== Personal life ==
In 1908, Soddy married Winifred Moller Beilby (1885–1936), the daughter of industrial chemist Sir George Beilby and Lady Emma Bielby, a philanthropist to women's causes. The couple worked together and co-published a paper in 1910 on the absorption of gamma rays from radium. He died in Brighton, England in 1956, twenty days after his 79th birthday.

== Bibliography ==
- Radio-Activity (1904)
- The Interpretation of Radium (1909)
- Matter and Energy (1911)
- The Chemistry of the Radio-elements (1911)
- Science and Life: Aberdeen addresses (1920)
- Cartesian Economics: The Bearing of Physical Science upon State Stewardship (1921)
- Nobel Lecture – The origins of the conception of isotopes (1922)
- Wealth, Virtual Wealth and Debt. The solution of the economic paradox (George Allen & Unwin, 1926). See also Wealth, Virtual Wealth and Debt.
- The wrecking of a scientific age (1927)
- Money versus Man (1931)
- The Interpretation of the Atom (1932) (at Archive.org. Free registration needed)
- The Role of Money (London: George Routledge & Sons Ltd, 1934)
- Money as nothing for something; The gold "standard" snare (1935)
- Abolish Private Money, or Drown in Debt (1939) (with Walter Crick)
- Present outlook, a warning : debasement of the currency, deflation and unemployment (1944)
- The Story of Atomic Energy (1949)
- Atomic Transmutation (1953)

== See also ==
- Ada Hitchins, who helped Soddy to discover the element protactinium
- Alfred J. Lotka
- Problem of Apollonius
- Oliver Sacks' autobiography Uncle Tungsten, in which Soddy, his work and his profound discoveries in atomic physics are extensively discussed and explained in Sacks' insightful and easily understandable language.
