= Heron (crater) =

Crater on the Moon

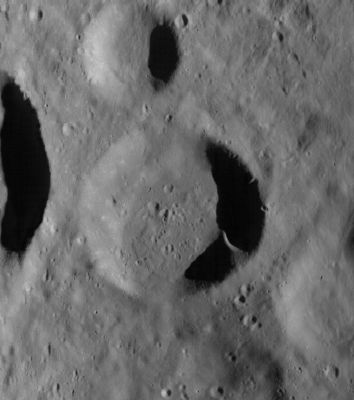
- LRO image
- Coordinates: 0.7°N 119.8°E
- Diameter: 28 km
- Depth: 0.6 km
- Colongitude: 241° at sunrise
- Eponym: Hero of Alexandria

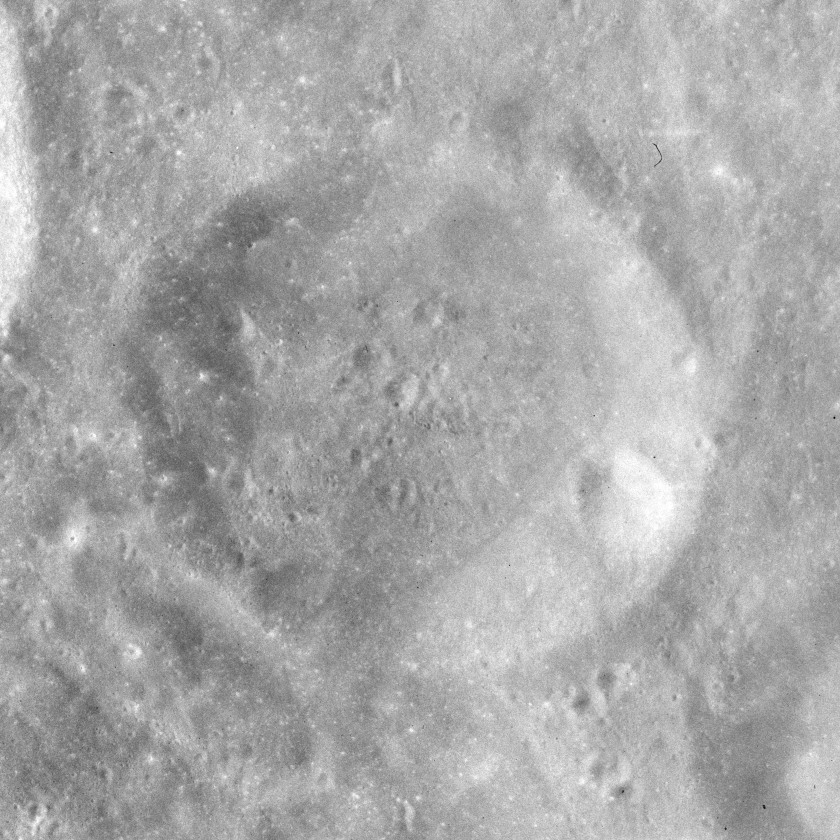
Apollo 16 image

Heron is a small lunar impact crater that lies on the far side of the Moon, less than 20 kilometers from the equator. It lies between the slightly larger crater Ctesibius just to the west and Soddy a little farther to the east. Almost directly to the north is the prominent crater King.

This formation is an undistinguished, circular crater. The interior floor is relatively flat and featureless. There is a tiny craterlet along the eastern rim that has a slightly higher albedo than the remainder of the crater.

This crater is also called Hero in some references. It was named after 1st century BC Egyptian inventor Heron (or Hero) of Alexandria.

== Satellite craters ==
By convention these features are identified on lunar maps by placing the letter on the side of the crater midpoint that is closest to Heron.

Heron	Latitude	Longitude	Diameter
H	0.2° N	120.7° E	20 km
Y	1.4° N	119.7° E	15 km
