= Recession shapes =

Economic term to distinguish types of recessions

Recession shapes, or recovery shapes, are terms used by economists to describe different types of recessions and their subsequent recoveries. There is no specific academic theory or classification system for recession shapes; rather the terminology is used as an informal shorthand to characterize recessions and their recoveries. The most commonly used terms are V-shaped (with variations of square-root shaped, and Nike-swoosh shaped), U-shaped, W-shaped (also known as a double-dip recession), and L-shaped recessions, with the COVID-19 pandemic leading to the K-shaped recession (also known as a two-stage recession). The names derive from the shape the graphed economic data takes during the recession and recovery.

== V-shaped ==
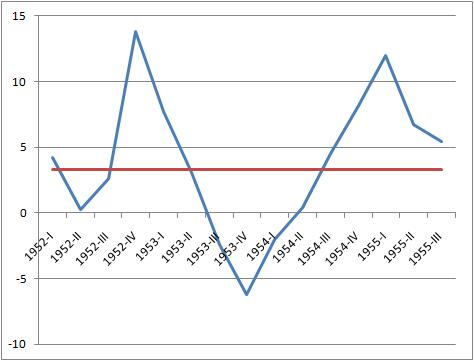
V-Shape: US 1953 recession Percent Change in Real GDP (annualized; seasonally adjusted); Average GDP growth 1947–2009 Source: BEA

In a V-shaped recession, the economy suffers a sharp but brief period of economic decline with a clearly defined trough, followed by a strong recovery. V-shapes are the normal shape for a recession, as the strength of the economic recovery is typically closely related to the severity of the preceding recession.

An example of a V-shaped recession is the Recession of 1953 in the United States. In the early 1950s, the economy in the United States was growing, but because the Federal Reserve expected inflation, it raised interest rates, tipping the economy into recession. In 1953, growth began to slow in the third quarter and the economy shrank by 2.4 percent. In the fourth quarter, the economy shrank by 6.2 percent, and in the first quarter of 1954, it shrank by 2 percent before returning to growth. By the fourth quarter of 1954, the economy was growing at an 8 percent pace, well above the trend. Thus GDP growth for this recession formed a V-shape.

During the 2020 recession caused by the COVID-19 pandemic, where the left side of the V was particularly severe, some commentators expected that the recovery might not follow a full V-shape (i.e. right side equal to the drop from the left side), but would look more like a square-root shape, or a Nike-swoosh shape (square-root but with an upward trending right arm). By August 2020, the Federal Reserve was expecting a "bumpy" Nike-swoosh recovery.

== U-shaped ==
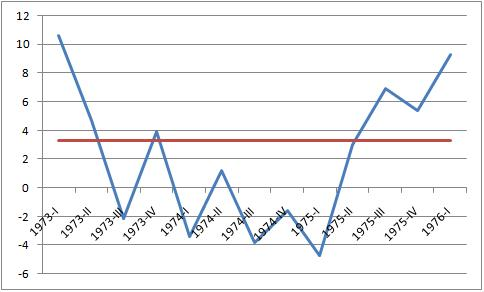
U-Shape: US 1973–75 recession Percent Change in Real GDP (annualized; seasonally adjusted); Average GDP growth 1947–2009 Source: BEA

A U-shaped recession is longer than a V-shaped recession and has a less-clearly defined trough. GDP may shrink for several quarters, and only slowly return to trend growth. Simon Johnson, former chief economist for the International Monetary Fund, says a U-shaped recession is like a bathtub: "You go in. You stay in. The sides are slippery. You know, maybe there's some bumpy stuff in the bottom, but you don't come out of the bathtub for a long time."

The 1973–75 recession in the United States can be considered a U-shaped recession. In early 1973, the economy began to shrink and continued to decline or have very low growth for nearly two years. After bumping along the bottom, the economy climbed back to recovery in 1975.

== L-shaped ==
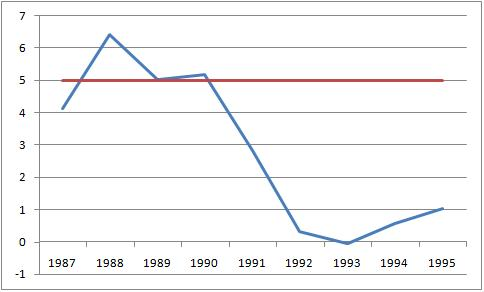
L-Shaped: Lost Decade in Japan. Percent Change in Real GDP (annualized; seasonally adjusted); Average GDP growth 1950–2000 Source: Penn World Tables

An L-shaped recession or depression occurs when an economy has a severe recession and does not return to trend line growth for many years, if ever. The steep decline, is followed by a flat line makes the shape of an L. This is the most severe of the different shapes of recession. Alternative terms for long periods of underperformance include "depression" and "lost decade"; compare also "malaise".

A classic example of an L-shaped recession occurred in Japan following the bursting of the Japanese asset price bubble in 1990. From the end of World War II throughout the 1980s, Japan's economy was growing robustly. In the late 1980s, a massive asset-price bubble developed in Japan. After the bubble burst the economy suffered from deflation, and experienced years of sluggish growth; never returning to the higher growth Japan experienced from 1950 to 1990. After the late-2000s recession in the United States followed a similar economic bubble (the United States housing bubble) some economists feared the U.S. economy could enter a prolonged period of low growth even after recovering from the recession. By 2013, however, U.S. GDP growth rebounded, allaying fears of stagnation.

== K-shaped ==
A K-shaped recession (or two-stage recession), is where parts of society experiences more of a V-shaped recession, while other parts of society experience a slower more protracted L-shaped recession (the shape of the K denoting the divergence in the recovery paths).

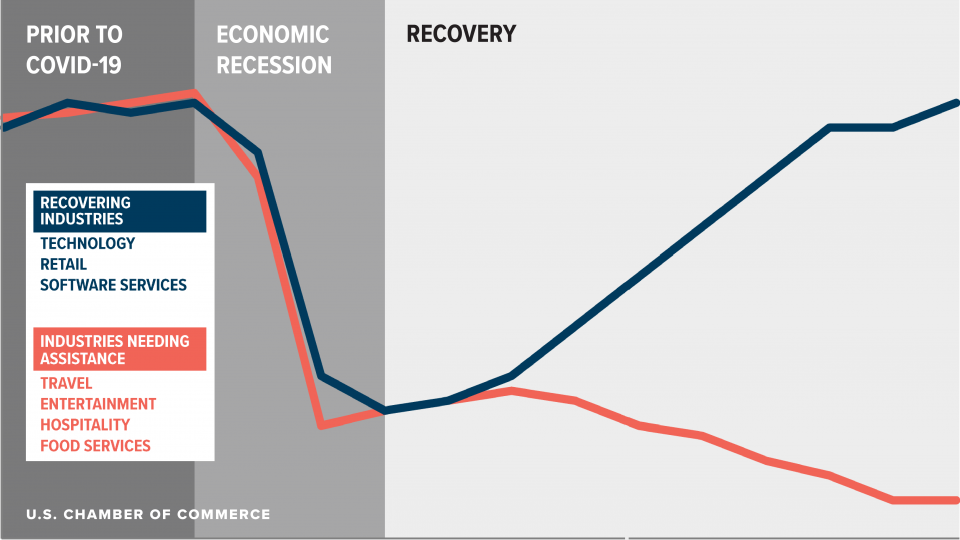
An example of a K-shaped recession during COVID-19

The term arose from the economic recovery post the COVID-19 pandemic, where central banks had used exceptional monetary tools to generate asset bubbles that protected the wealthier segments of society (i.e. asset-owning), from the financial effects of the pandemic. K-shaped recoveries are controversial, and the 2020 K-shaped recovery in the United States led to levels of wealth inequality not seen since the 1920s. In December 2020, Bloomberg News called 2020, "... a great year for Wall Street, but a bear market for humans". In January 2021, Edward Luce of the Financial Times warned that Jerome Powell's explicit use of asset bubbles in creating a K-shaped recovery, and the resultant widening of wealth inequality, could lead to political and social instability in the United States, saying: "The majority of people are suffering amid a Great Gatsby–style boom at the top".

Two-stage recessions have been described as "vibecessions", a portmanteau of the words vibes and recession. This neologism describes a disconnect between a country's economic indicators and the public's negative perception of the economy. Some commentators attributed the vibecession to the role of negativity bias in media consumption, where consumers are more drawn to alarming headlines than positive news.

== Others ==
- Inverted square root: Financier George Soros said the 2009 recession could follow an "inverted square root sign"–shaped recession. Soros explained to Reuters that this meant: "You hit bottom and you automatically rebound some (i.e. a spike), but then you don't come out of it in a V-shape recovery or anything like that. You settle down—step down". Soros actually meant reverse instead of "inverted" square root shape of economic recovery. A similar shape of recovery was observed during the COVID-19 pandemic induced economic crisis.
- Normal square root: During the COVID-19 pandemic, several commentators used the shape of a normal square root to describe a situation where the recovery would not be complete (as per a V-shaped recovery), but after an initial rise, would flatline for a period.

== See also ==
- Glossary of shapes with metaphorical names
- List of recessions in the United States
