= Wealth, Virtual Wealth and Debt =

1926 book by Frederick Soddy

Wealth, Virtual Wealth and Debt is a 1926 book by the Nobel Prize–winning chemist Frederick Soddy on monetary policy and society and the role of energy in economic systems. Soddy criticized the focus on monetary flows in economics, arguing that real wealth was derived from the use of energy to transform materials into physical goods and services. Soddy’s economic writings were largely ignored in his time, but would later be applied to the development of ecological economics in the late 20th century.

== Real wealth and virtual wealth ==
In this book Soddy points out the fundamental difference between real wealth (consumables such as buildings, equipment, energy, food) and virtual wealth, in the form of money and debt. Soddy contends that real wealth is subject to entropy and will rot, rust, wear out, or be consumed over time, while money and debt (as artificial accounting devices) are subject only to the laws of mathematics, not the laws of thermodynamics. As debt compounding at some rate of interest, virtual wealth will grow effortlessly over time and without limit, instead of diminishing with use as does real wealth. Soddy uses actual occurring examples to demonstrate what he considers a major flaw of prevailing economic theory.

== See also ==
- Bioeconomics
