= 1973–1975 recession =

Period of economic stagnation in the Western world

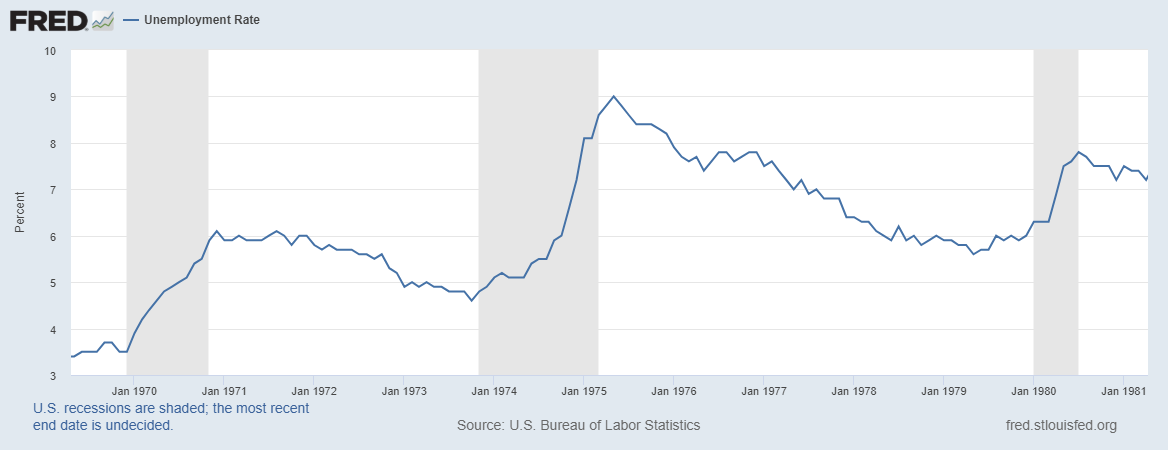
The US unemployment rate, 1969–1981

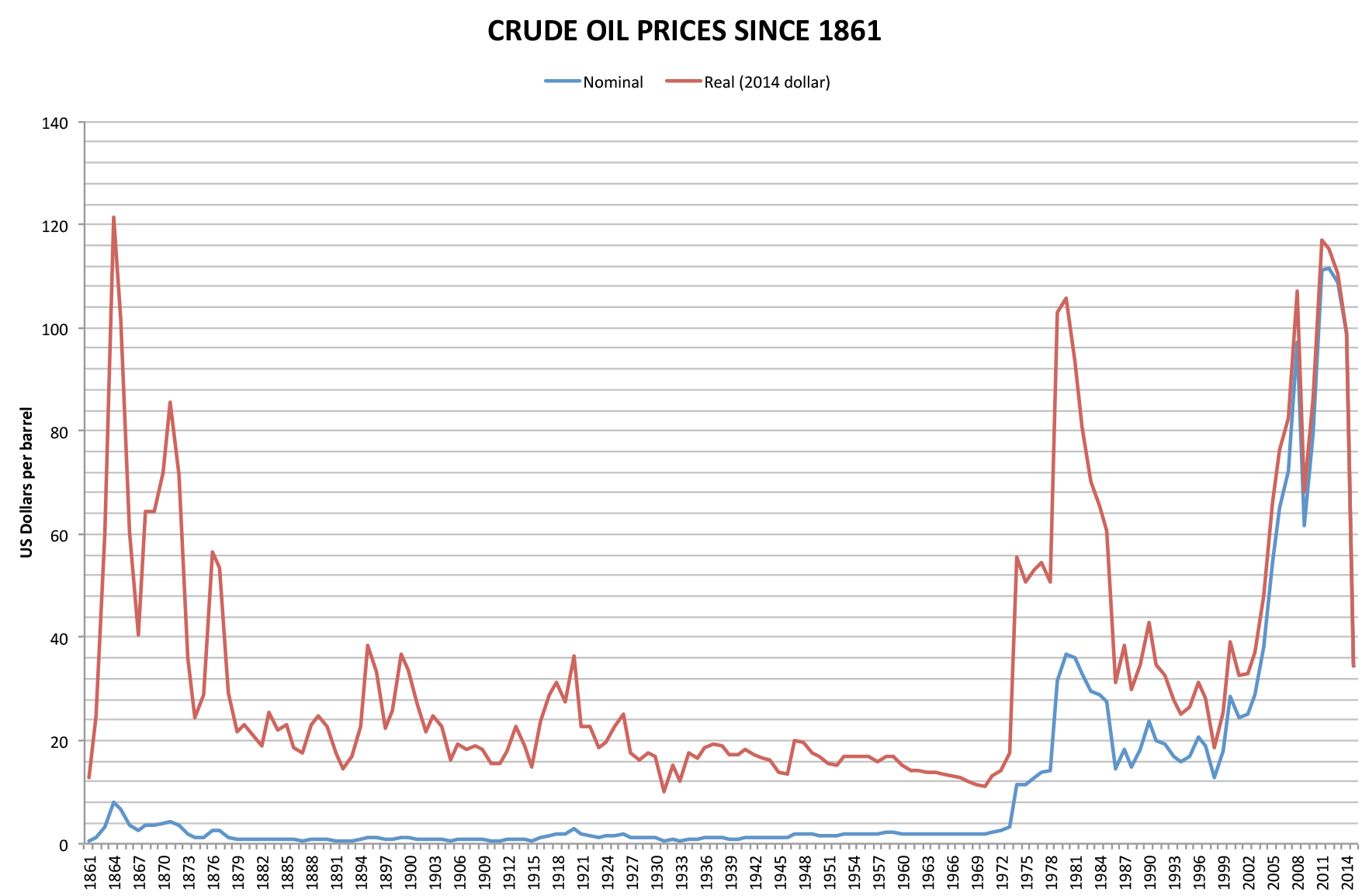
Oil prices in USD, 1861–2015. Measured are 1861–1944 averaged US crude oil, 1945–1983 Arabian Light, 1984–2015 Brent. Red line adjusted for inflation, blue not adjusted.

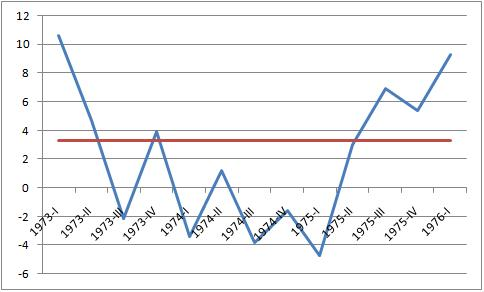
In the parlance of recession shapes, the Recession of 1973–75 in the United States could be considered a U-shaped recession, because of its prolonged period of weak growth and contraction. The percent change from preceding period in real gross domestic product, annualized and seasonally adjusted Average GDP growth 1947–2009 Source: Bureau of Economic Analysis

The 1973–1975 recession or 1970s recession was a period of economic stagnation in much of the Western world (i.e. the United States, Canada, Western Europe, Australia, and New Zealand) during the 1970s, putting an end to the overall post–World War II economic expansion. It differed from many previous recessions by involving stagflation, in which high unemployment and high inflation existed simultaneously.

== United States ==
Among the causes were the 1973 oil crisis, the deficits of the Vietnam War, and the fall of the Bretton Woods system after the Nixon shock. The emergence of newly industrialized countries increased competition in the metal industry, triggering a steel crisis, where industrial core areas in North America and Europe were forced to re-structure. The 1973–74 stock market crash made the recession evident.

The recession in the United States lasted from November 1973 (the Richard Nixon presidency) to March 1975 (the Gerald Ford presidency), and its effects on the US were felt through the Jimmy Carter presidency until the mid-term of Ronald Reagan's first term as president, characterized by low economic growth. Although the economy was expanding from 1975 to the first recession of the early 1980s, which began in January 1980, inflation remained extremely high until the early 1980s.

The U.S. Bureau of Labor Statistics estimates that 2.3 million jobs were lost during the recession; at the time, this was a post-war record.

Although the recession ended in March 1975, the unemployment rate did not peak for several months. In May 1975, the rate reached its height for the cycle of 9 percent. Four cycles have had higher peaks than this: the Great Depression, where unemployment peaked at 25% in 1933; the early 1980s recession where unemployment peaked at 10.8% in November and December 1982; the late 2000s recession, where the unemployment rate peaked at 10 percent in October 2009 in the United States; and the COVID-19 recession where unemployment peaked at 14.7% in 2020.

== United Kingdom ==
The recession also lasted from 1973 to 1975 in the United Kingdom. GDP declined by 3.9% depending on the source. It took 14 quarters for the UK's GDP to recover to that at the start of recession.

The oil crisis was largely to blame for the downturn in the United Kingdom, just as it was in the US, although an additional crisis came in the form of the Three-Day Week, which was the result of fears over power shortages as a miner's strike was announced in December 1973. The three-day week was a state of emergency imposed by Conservative prime minister Edward Heath, which came into force on 1 January 1974, meaning that commercial users of electricity were limited to three specific consecutive days' consumption of electricity, and forbidden to work longer hours of those days, although services deemed essential were exempted from these regulations. Electricity blackouts across the country were widespread.

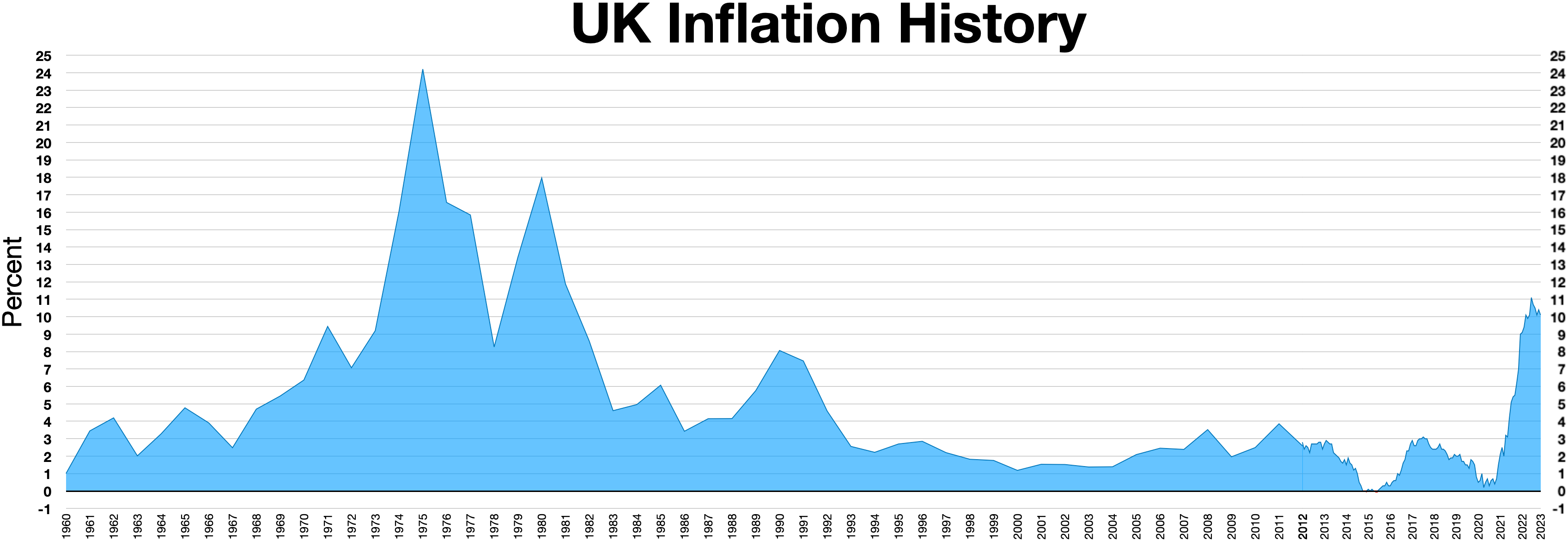
Uk inflation history, 1960 to 2023

There was also double-digit inflation during this period, which peaked at more than 20%.

The prime minister, Edward Heath, wanted to increase the domestically sourced production of coal and offered a 13% pay rise to the coal miners. However it was rejected by the miners unions who wanted a 35% pay rise. He responded by calling a snap election on 28 February 1974 in what he saw as an opportunity for the electorate to show the miners that the government – and not the miners or the unions – were responsible for running the country.

Most opinion polls suggested that the Tories would be re-elected with a majority, but when the election results came through on the morning of 1 March 1974, no party had an overall majority. The gap between Ted Heath's Tory government and the Labour opposition led by Harold Wilson, who had been prime minister for nearly six years until his surprise defeat by Heath's Tories in the 1970 election, was so narrow that the Tories received the most votes, but Labour won slightly more seats.

Heath fought to keep the Tories in government by attempting to form a coalition with the Liberal Party and offering a cabinet post to Liberal leader Jeremy Thorpe, but this attempt to remain in power proved unsuccessful for Heath and he was forced to resign as prime minister on 4 March, paving the way for Harold Wilson's Labour to return to power as a minority government before winning a second election on 10 October by a majority of just three seats.

Economic growth was re-established in 1975 as the recession's end was declared, but Britain's economy remained shaky. Inflation remained high, strikes continued to cripple manufacturing and public services, unemployment continued to rise above the 1,000,000 mark, and just after the resignation of Harold Wilson as prime minister in March 1976, his successor James Callaghan was forced to call on the International Monetary Fund for a multibillion-pound bail-out in an attempt to bolster Britain's flagging economy.

The Labour government's tiny majority was wiped out by early 1977 as a result of by-election defeats, and Callaghan managed to form a coalition with the Liberals to hang onto power. The pact concluded in the summer of 1978, by which time economic growth had picked up (although unemployment now stood at a postwar high of 1,500,000), and opinion polls suggested that Labour could form a majority government if a general election was held.

Callaghan ruled out an election in September 1978, and within weeks a series of strikes began which would spark the Winter of Discontent. In March 1979, a vote of no confidence issued by Tory opposition leader Margaret Thatcher sparked the collapse of the Labour government and in the election in May that year, the Tories returned to power.

In the first year of the Thatcher-led Tory government inflation rose to 15.3%, but then fell to 5% by the time of their election win in 1983. However, the monetarist policies designed to curb inflation caused a recession in 1980 and resulted in a steep rise in unemployment from 5.4% (1,390,46 people) to 11.5% (3,104,66 people). It was not until 2000, by which time Labour had been re-elected as New Labour under Tony Blair that unemployment fell to the level in 1979.

== West Germany ==
West Germany, Europe's largest economy at the time, had the largest post-war GDP fall in 1975. During the recession industrial production fell and inflation was 5%.

== Spain ==
In Spain, the sharp rise in oil prices severely impacted Spain due to its heavy dependence on imported petroleum and energy-intensive industrial model, ending the expansionary period that had begun in 1960. The economic difficulties were compounded by the political transition following Francisco Franco's death in 1975, hampering crisis management. By 1977, Spain faced stagflation, soaring inflation (peaking at 26–44.7%), rising unemployment (700,000–900,000), a current account deficit over $5 billion, and public debt of $12 billion. In response, the 1977 Moncloa Pacts implemented wage moderation, monetary restraint, peseta devaluation, tax reform, and financial controls, though recovery was set back by the 1979–1980 oil crisis. Moreover, Spain's failure to adjust to the changed environment brought on by the two oil price shocks led to plummeting productivity, explosive wage increases from 1974 to 1976, a reversal of migration trends due to the Western European slump, and continued rural exodus despite declining urban job prospects, all of which drove unemployment sharply upward, while government budget deficits swelled alongside social security cost overruns and heavy losses in public-sector industries, with energy consumption remaining high.

Restrictive policies continued under the Premiership of Felipe González after 1982, with another devaluation and wage moderation, but unemployment kept rising until recession eased in 1984. When González's Socialist government took office in late 1982, it inherited 16% annual inflation, a $4 billion current account arrears, large public spending, and depleted foreign reserves, yet it possessed a solid parliamentary majority that allowed it to undertake unpopular austerity measures. The government adopted pragmatic orthodox monetary and fiscal policies, along with vigorous retrenchment, and in 1983 unveiled a long-term program featuring industrial reconversion, social security reform, more efficient energy-use policies, improved labor market flexibility, and incentives for private investment, including the closure of unprofitable state enterprises. Growth resumed in 1985, boosted by Spain's accession to the European Economic Community on June 12, 1985, which enhanced trade, capital inflows, and EU aid, marking a turning point after a decade of deep crisis.

== Sweden ==
In Sweden, the recession proved devastating to the shipping, ship-building, and logging and mining industries. The increase in oil prices caused export revenues from shipping to drop by 25% within a few years. Sweden at this time had the world's second largest ship building industry after Japan, and the spillover effects devastated shipbuilders. Swedish shipbuilders lost some 3 billion SEK in 1974, which led to problems in Sweden's steel industry. The loss of shipbuilding jobs devastated port cities such as Malmö, home to Kockums' shipyard, which struggled for the next 20 years.

The ripple effects compounded issues in the iron ore mining industry, at a time when Swedish iron ore was experiencing rising mining costs and facing increased low-cost competition from new mines in places such as Australia and Brazil. The inflationary recession, combined with an expansionary government fiscal policy and a generous collective wage agreement among unions in 1974–1976, put Sweden on a highly inflationary path: the price index quintupled between 1972 and 1995.

Between 1965 and 1979, the public sector's share of total employment rose from 12% to 30%, which greatly increased the total tax burden at a time of escalating costs and prices, which fed into wage settlements, competitiveness, and profitability, and contributed to a sharply deteriorated trade balance.

== The rest of the world ==
The oil crisis of 1973 also had similarly large negative effects on other countries that relied heavily on imported oil, such as France, Sweden, Japan, Finland, Belgium, Luxembourg, and Denmark.

Some newly industrialized countries saw some diversionary benefits from the crisis, namely Spain, Korea, Taiwan, Singapore, Mexico, and Brazil, as their low-cost environments attracted new investments and gave their products a competitive edge over competitors in higher-cost, developed countries suffering from higher energy costs. These countries gained increased market share both in their domestic markets and abroad at accelerating rates during the 1970s.

== Economic recovery ==
In the United States, the economic recovery from the 1973 to 1975 recession had many of the characteristics of a typical U-type recovery. GNP (the measure at the time) reached and exceeded its pre-recession level by first quarter 1976. Industrial production had recovered to its pre-recession levels by the end of 1976.

The major influence of the experience of the 1974 recession came in the form of the concept of stagflation, that is, inflation during a period of recession. The Federal Reserve adjusted its mandate as a result, believing that the inflation-unemployment tradeoff was much higher than previously thought, and established a 6% target as full employment. Thus, unemployment, which had reached a peak of 9% in May 1975, did not dip below 6% until June 1978. The pre-1974 recession level of 4.6% unemployment was not reached again until November 1997, when the Federal Reserve deviated from its prior policy.

The interpretation regarding the cause of stagflation was and continues to be controversial. The oil embargo of 1973–1974, which pushed prices of petroleum from $15 to $45 a barrel (2010 dollars) almost overnight, certainly contributed to inflationary measures during this period, taking a larger share of incomes (an "oil tax") at a time of falling consumer spending. The price of petroleum products continued to rise throughout the decade, reaching a peak of about $73 a barrel (2010 dollars) in 1979 as a result of the Iranian revolution, a price not exceeded until 2008 in the wake of dislocations due to the war in Iraq.

== See also ==
- 1970s energy crisis
- List of recessions in the United States
- List of recessions in the United Kingdom
- Phillips curve
- Steel crisis
- 1973–1974 stock market crash
