= Lists of recessions =

The following articles contain lists of recessions:

- List of recessions in Canada
- List of recessions in the United Kingdom
- List of recessions in the United States
