= List of economic crises =

This is a list of economic crises and depressions.

== 1st century ==
- Financial crisis of 33. The result of the mass issuance of unsecured loans by main Roman banking houses.

== 3rd century ==
- Crisis of the Third Century (235–285)

== 7th century ==
- Coin exchange crisis of 692. Byzantine emperor Justinian II refuses to accept tribute from the Umayyad Caliphate with new Arab gold coins for fear of exposing double counting in the Byzantine financial system (actual weight less, than nominal quantity), which leads to the Battle of Sebastopolis and the revolt of taxpayers who burned financial officials in a copper bull. Justinian II was tortured by cutting off his nose in front of spectators at the Hippodrome. Twenty Years' Anarchy begins.

== 14th century ==
- 14th century banking crisis (the crash of the Peruzzi and the Bardi family Compagnia dei Bardi in 1345).
- Hyperinflation in the Yuan Dynasty (1350s). Public confidence in the dynasty's fiat money is lost due to the poor quality of the issued currency and overprinting to finance the military. Paper money in China loses its value and is substituted with Bartering.

== 15th century ==
- Great Slump (1430s-1480s)

== 17th century ==
- Kipper und Wipper (1618–22) financial crisis at the start of the Thirty Years' War.
- Tulip mania (1637) an economic bubble that burst, though it did not harm the economy of the Dutch Republic.
- The General Crisis (1640s): one of the worst crises ever, as it had a worldwide effect.

== 18th century ==
- Great Tobacco Depression (1703) (British America)
- South Sea Bubble (1720) (UK)
- Mississippi Company (1720) (France)
- Amsterdam banking crisis of 1763 – begun by the collapse of Leendert Pieter de Neufville and Johann Ernst Gotzkowsky, spread to Germany and Scandinavia
- Bengal Bubble of 1769 (India) – started by the rapid overvaluation of the East India Company.
- British credit crisis of 1772–1773 – started in London and Amsterdam, begun by the collapse of the bankers Neal, James, Fordyce, and Down.
- War of American Independence Financing Crisis (1776) (United States) – The French monarchy went deeply into debt to finance its 1.4 billion livre support for the colonial rebels; Spain invested 700 million reales.
- Panic of 1785 – United States
- Copper Panic of 1789 – United States
- Panic of 1792 – United States
- Panic of 1796–1797 – Britain and United States

== 19th century ==
- Danish state bankruptcy of 1813
- Post-Napoleonic Depression (post-1815) (England)
- Panic of 1819, a U.S. recession with bank failures; culmination of U.S.'s first boom-to-bust economic cycle
- Panic of 1825, a pervasive British recession in which many banks failed, nearly including the Bank of England
- Panic of 1837, a U.S. recession with bank failures, followed by a 5-year depression
- Panic of 1847, started as a collapse of British financial markets associated with the end of the 1840s railway industry boom
- Panic of 1857, a U.S. recession with bank failures
- Indian economic crash of 1865
- Panic of 1866, was an international financial downturn that accompanied the failure of Overend, Gurney and Company in London
- Great depression of British agriculture (1873–1896)
- Long Depression (1873–1896)
  - Panic of 1873, a US recession with bank failures, followed by a four-year depression
  - Depression of 1882–1885
  - Panic of 1884.
  - Panic of 1890.
  - Panic of 1893, a US recession with bank failures
  - Australian banking crisis of 1893
  - Panic of 1896

== 20th century ==
=== 1900s ===
- Panic of 1901, a U.S. economic recession that started with a fight for financial control of the Northern Pacific Railway
- Panic of 1907, a U.S. economic recession with bank failures

=== 1910s ===
- Panic of 1910–1911
- Financial crisis of 1914
- Post–World War I recession

=== 1920s ===
- Recession of 1920–1921
- Wall Street crash of 1929 and Great Depression (1929–1939), one of the worst economic crises in history

=== 1930s ===
- Recession of 1937–1938

=== 1940s ===
- Recession of 1949

=== 1950s ===
- Recession of 1953
- 1957–1958 Indian economic crisis
- Recession of 1958

=== 1960s ===
- Recession of 1960–1961
- 1965–1966 Indian economic crisis
- Recession of 1969–1970

=== 1970s ===
- 1970s energy crisis
  - OPEC oil price shock (1973)
  - Energy crisis (1979)
- 1972–1973 Indian economic crisis
- 1973–1975 recession
- Rodrigazo, Argentina (1975)
- Secondary banking crisis of 1973–1975, in the UK
- 1979–1980 Indian economic crisis
- Latin American debt crisis (late 1970s to early 1980s), the "lost decade"

=== 1980s ===
- Early 1980s Recession
- Crisis of 1982, in Chile
- 1982–1985 Bolivian economic crisis
- 1983 Israel bank stock crisis
- Japanese asset price bubble (1986–1992)
- Black Monday (1987) US stock market crash
- Savings and loan crisis (1986–1995) failure of 1,043 out of the 3,234 S&L banks in the U.S.

=== 1990s ===
- Special Period in Cuba (1990–1994)
- Early 1990s Recession
- 1991 Indian economic crisis
- 1990s Finnish banking crisis
- 1990–1994 Swedish financial crisis
- Black Wednesday (1992)
- Mexican peso crisis (1994)
- 1997 Asian financial crisis
- 1998 Russian financial crisis
- 1998–1999 Ecuador economic crisis
- 1998–2002 Argentine great depression
- Samba effect (1999) Brazil

== 21st century ==
=== 2000s ===
- 1998–2002 Argentine great depression
- Early 2000s recession
  - Dot-com bubble (2000–2002) (US)
- 2001 Turkish economic crisis
- September 11 attacks (2001)
- 2002 Uruguay banking crisis
- 2002–2003 Venezuelan general strike
- 2006–2012 New Zealand finance company collapses
- 2008 financial crisis
- Great Recession (worldwide)
  - 2000s energy crisis (2003–2009) oil price bubble
  - Subprime mortgage crisis (US) (2007–2010)
  - 2000s United States housing bubble and 2000s United States housing market correction (2003–2011)
  - 2008–2010 automotive industry crisis (US)
  - 2008–2011 Icelandic financial crisis
  - Post-2008 Irish banking crisis
  - Great Recession in Russia
  - 2008 Latvian financial crisis
  - Venezuelan banking crisis of 2009–2010
  - 2008–2014 Spanish financial crisis

=== 2010s ===
- European debt crisis (EU) (2009–2019)
  - Greek government-debt crisis (2009–2018)
- 2010–2014 Portuguese financial crisis
- Black Monday (2011)
- 2012–2013 Cypriot financial crisis
- Crisis in Venezuela (2012–current)
- Russian financial crisis (2014–2016)
- 2014-2016 Brazilian economic crisis
- 2015–2016 Chinese stock market turbulence
- Turkish economic crisis (2018–current)
- 2018–present Argentine monetary crisis

=== 2020s ===
- COVID-19 recession / Economic impact of the COVID-19 pandemic (2020–2023)
  - 2020 stock market crash (2020)
- Lebanese liquidity crisis (2019–present)
- Sri Lankan economic crisis (2019–2024)
- Chinese property sector crisis (2020–present)
- Pakistani economic crisis (2022–2024)
- German economic crisis (2022–present)
- Economic impact of the Russian invasion of Ukraine
- 2025 stock market crash
- Economic impact of the 2026 Iran war
  - 2026 Iran war fuel crisis

== See also ==
- Financial crisis and economic collapse
- Currency crisis, hyperinflation and devaluation
- Banking crisis, credit crunch
- Savings and loan crisis
- Economic depression, recession, stagflation, jobless recovery
- Economic bubble, stock market bubble and real-estate bubble
- Market correction, real and nominal value, economic equilibrium
- Kondratiev wave, business cycle and business cycle models
- Involuntary unemployment
- Fictitious capital, Intrinsic value, Speculation
- Crisis theory, tendency of the rate of profit to fall, reserve army of labour
- Overproduction, underconsumption and demand shortfall
- Consolidation (business), market concentration
- Capital flight, capital strike, urban decay, deindustrialization
- Wage-price spiral
- List of stock market crashes and bear markets
- Stock market crashes in India
- List of banking crises
- List of oil crises
