= List of recessions in the United States =

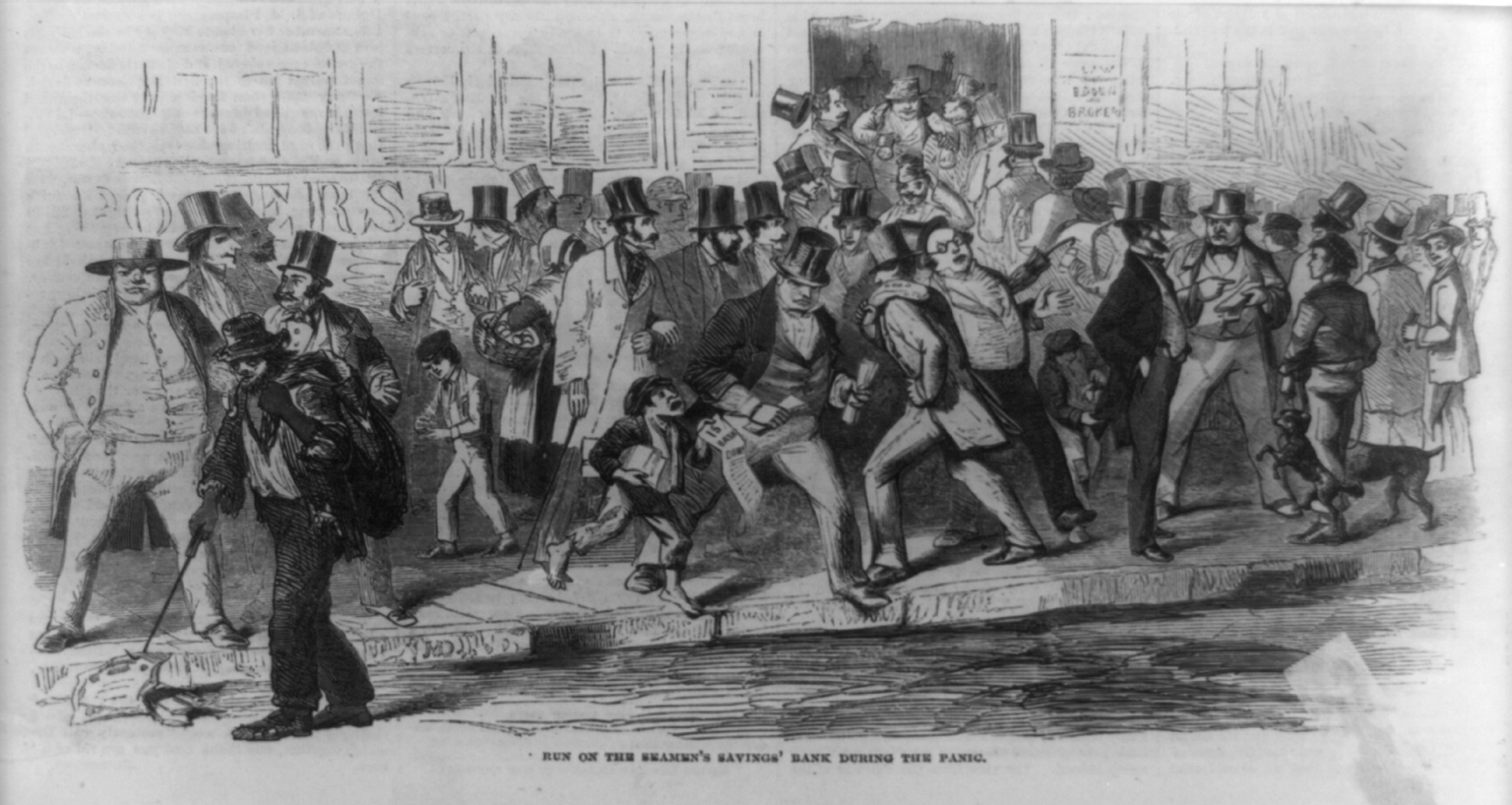
Bank run on the Seamen's Savings Bank during the panic of 1857

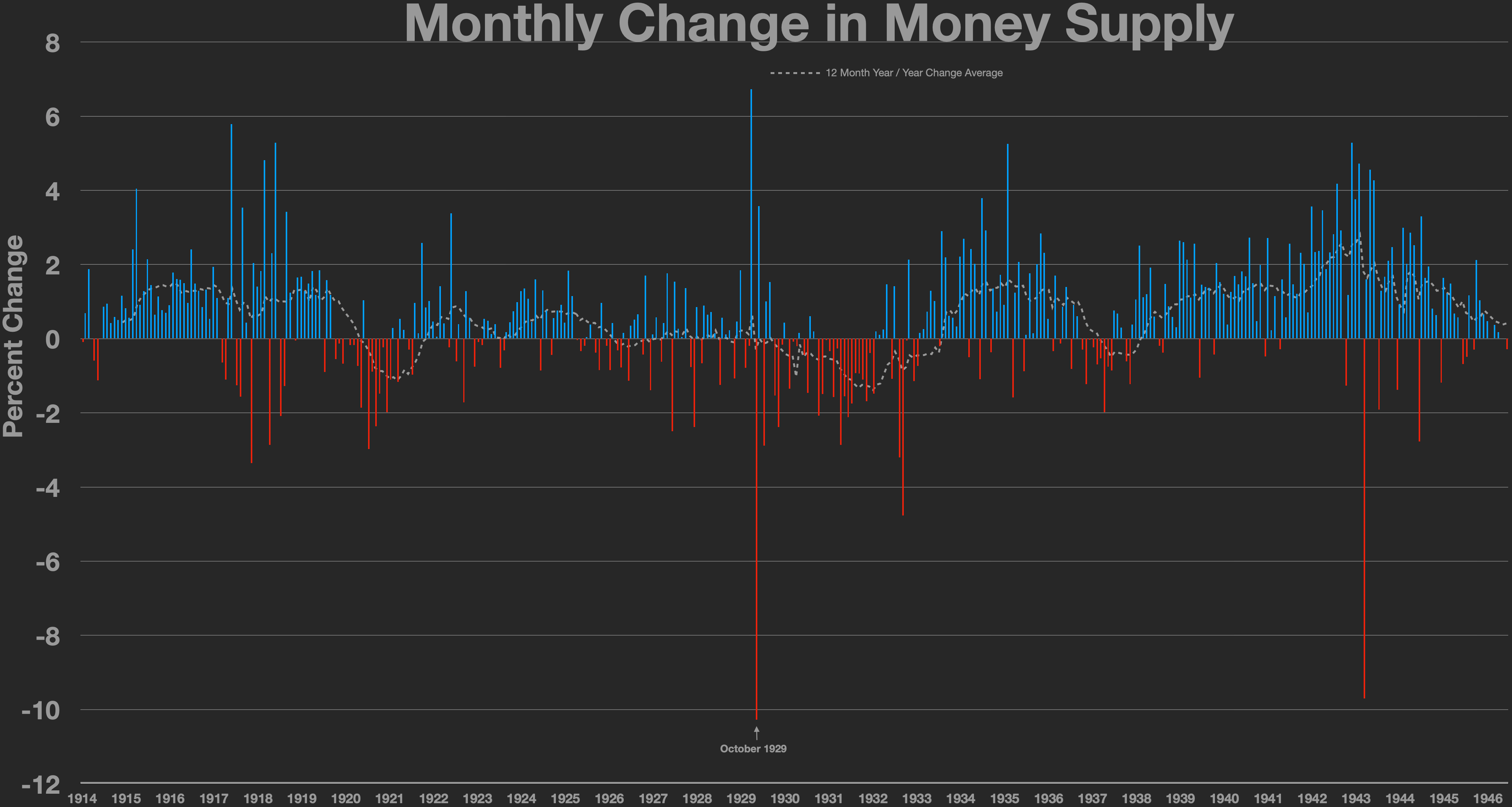
Total money supply contracted -10.28% in October 1929 and continued to contract for the next few years during the Great Depression and Herbert Hoover's presidency

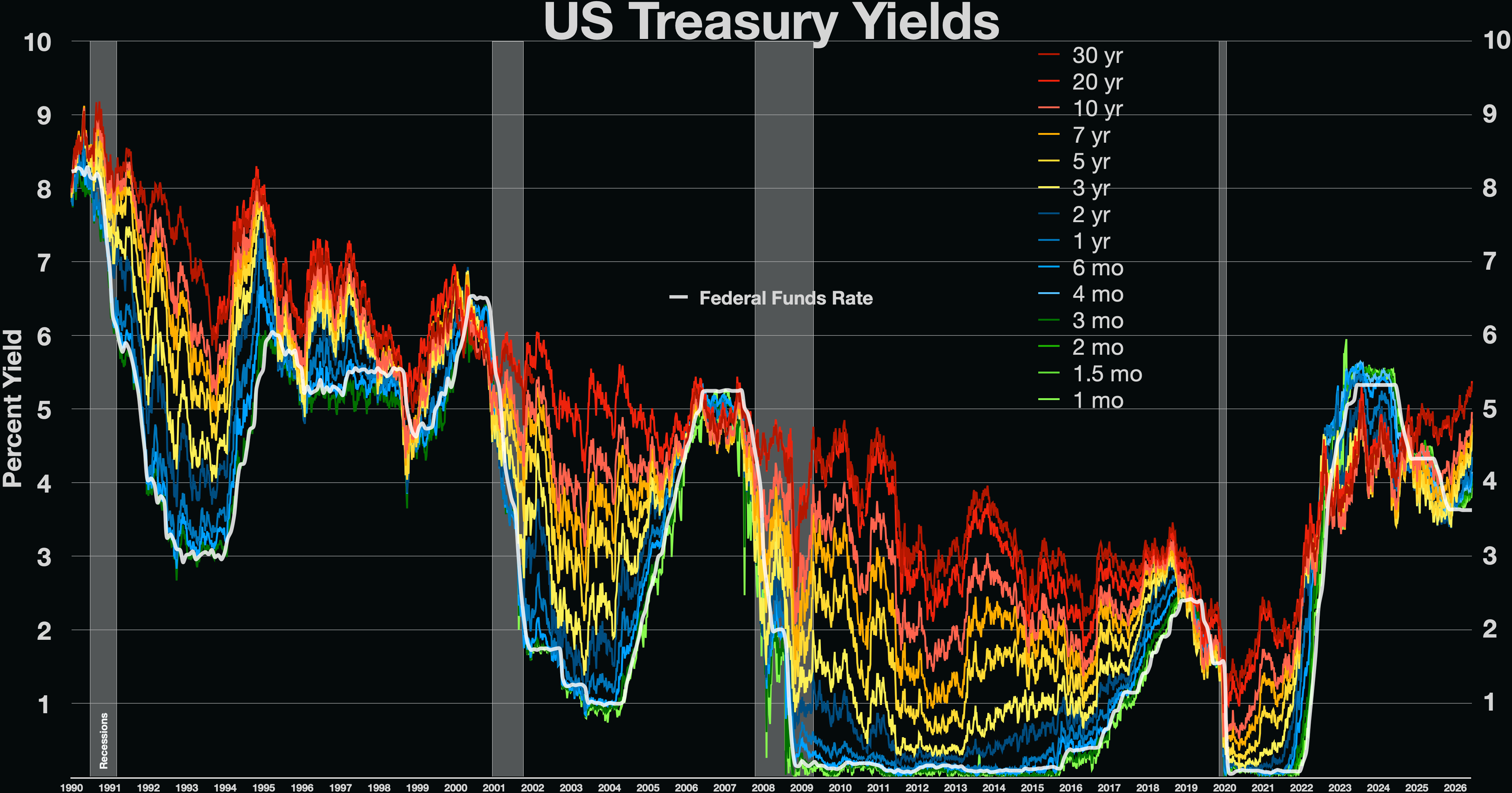
US Treasury interest rates compared to the Federal Funds Rate. When the shorter term treasuries get pushed above the longer term treasuries, by the Federal Funds Rate, it causes an Inverted yield curve.

There have been as many as 48 recessions in the United States dating back to the Articles of Confederation, and although economists and historians dispute certain 19th-century recessions, the consensus view among economists and historians is that "the [cyclical] volatility of GNP and unemployment was greater before the Great Depression than it has been since the end of World War II." Cycles in the country's agricultural production, industrial production, consumption, business investment, and the health of the banking industry contribute to these declines. U.S. recessions have increasingly affected economies on a worldwide scale, especially as countries' economies become more intertwined.

The unofficial beginning and ending dates of recessions in the United States have been defined by the National Bureau of Economic Research (NBER), an American private nonprofit research organization. The NBER defines a recession as "a significant decline in economic activity spread across the economy, lasting more than two quarters which is 6 months, normally visible in real gross domestic product (GDP), real income, employment, industrial production, and wholesale-retail sales". (Note: The rule of thumb defining recession as two quarters of negative GDP growth is not used by NBER. The NBER looks for monthly dating (GDP is a quarterly figure) and GDP growth will sometimes be positive even in clear periods of decline, e.g. in the second quarter of 1918, GDP growth was slightly positive even in the middle of the severe 1973–1975 recession.)

In the 19th century, recessions frequently coincided with a financial crisis. Determining the occurrence of pre-20th-century recessions is more difficult due to the dearth of economic statistics, so scholars rely on historical accounts of economic activity, such as contemporary newspapers or business ledgers. Although the NBER does not date recessions before 1857, economists customarily extrapolate dates of U.S. recessions back to 1790 from business annals based on various contemporary descriptions. Their work is aided by historical patterns, in that recessions often follow external shocks to the economic system such as wars and variations in the weather affecting agriculture, as well as banking crises.

Major modern economic statistics, such as unemployment and GDP, were not compiled on a regular and standardized basis until after World War II. The average duration of the 11 recessions between 1945 and 2001 is 10 months, compared to 18 months for recessions between 1919 and 1945, and 22 months for recessions from 1854 to 1919. Because of the great changes in the economy over the centuries, it is difficult to compare the severity of modern recessions to early recessions. Before the COVID-19 recession began in March 2020, no post-World War II era had come anywhere near the depth of the Great Depression, which lasted from 1929 until 1941 (which included a bull market between 1933 and 1937) and was caused by the 1929 crash of the stock market and other factors.

== Early recessions and crises (1785–1836) ==
Attempts have been made to date recessions in America beginning in 1790. These periods of recession were not identified until the 1920s. To construct the dates, researchers studied business annals during the period and constructed time series of the data. The earliest recessions for which there is the most certainty are those that coincide with major financial crises.

Beginning in 1835, an index of business activity by the Cleveland Trust Company provides data for comparison between recessions. Beginning in 1854, the National Bureau of Economic Research dates recession peaks and troughs to the month. However, a standardized index does not exist for the earliest recessions.

In 1791, Congress chartered the First Bank of the United States to handle the country's financial needs. The bank had some functions of a modern central bank, although it was responsible for only 20% of the young country's currency. In 1811 the bank's charter lapsed, but it was replaced by the Second Bank of the United States, which lasted from 1816 to 1836.

Name	Dates (Note: The NBER's monthly chronology of recessions begins in 1854. In the 1920s, the economist Willard Thorp, working for the NBER, dated business cycles back to 1790 (with the first recession beginning in 1796). Thorp's dates remain the standard for this period. Thorp's crude annual dates are not directly comparable to the NBER's monthly dates i.e. a two-year recession from the annual dates could be many months shorter or longer than 24.)	Duration	Time since previous recession	Characteristics
Panic of 1785	1785–1788	~4 years		The panic of 1785, which lasted until 1788, ended the business boom that followed the American Revolution. The causes of the crisis lay in the overexpansion and debts incurred after the American independence, a postwar deflation, American manufacturers facing competition from their British counterparts, and the lack of adequate credit and a sound currency. The downturn was exacerbated by the absence of any significant interstate trade. Other factors were the refusal of the Kingdom of Great Britain to conclude a commercial treaty, and actual and pending defaults among debtor groups. The panic among business and propertied groups led to the demand for a stronger federal government.
Copper Panic of 1789	1789–1793	~4 years	~0 years	Loss of confidence in copper coins due to debasement and counterfeiting led to commercial freeze up that halted the economy of several states of the Northern United States and was not alleviated until the introduction of new paper money to restore confidence.
Panic of 1792	1792	~2 months	~0 years	Its causes included the extension of credit and excessive speculation. The panic was largely solved by providing banks the necessary funds to make open market purchases.
Panic of 1796–1797	1796–1799	~3 years	~4 years	Just as a land speculation bubble was bursting, deflation from the Bank of England (which was facing insolvency due to the cost of British involvement in the French Revolutionary Wars) crossed to North America and disrupted commercial and real estate markets in the United States and the Caribbean, and caused a major financial panic. Prosperity continued in the Southern United States, but economic activity was stagnant in the Northern United States for three years. The young United States engaged in the Quasi-War with France.
1802–1804 recession	1802–1804	~2 years	~3 years	A boom of war-time activity led to a decline after the Peace of Amiens ended the war between the United Kingdom and France. Commodity prices fell dramatically. Trade was disrupted by pirates, leading to the First Barbary War.
Depression of 1807	1807–1810	~3 years	~3 years	The Embargo Act of 1807 was passed by the United States Congress under President Thomas Jefferson as tensions increased with the United Kingdom. The Act severely impacted shipping-related industries in the United States. The Federalists fought the embargo and allowed American merchants to smuggle goods with their British counterparts in New England. Trade volumes, commodity prices and securities prices all began to fall. Macon's Bill Number 2 ended the embargoes in May 1810, and a recovery started.
1812 recession	1812	~6 months	~18 months	The United States entered a brief recession at the beginning of 1812. The decline was brief primarily because the United States soon increased production to fight the War of 1812, which began June 18, 1812.
1815–1821 depression	1815–1821	~6 years	~3 years	Shortly after the war ended on March 23, 1815, the United States entered a period of financial panic as bank notes rapidly depreciated because of inflation following the war. The 1815 panic was followed by several years of mild depression, and then a major financial crisis – the Panic of 1819, which featured widespread foreclosures, bank failures, unemployment, a collapse in real estate prices, and a slump in agriculture and manufacturing.
1822–1823 recession	1822–1823	~1 year	~1 year	After only a mild recovery following the lengthy 1815–1821 depression, commodity prices hit a peak in March 1822 and began to fall. Many businesses failed, unemployment rose and an increase in imports worsened the trade balance.
1825–1826 recession	1825–1826	~1 year	~2 years	The Panic of 1825, a stock crash following a bubble of speculative investments in Latin America led to a decline in business activity in the United States and the United Kingdom of Great Britain and Ireland. The recession coincided with a major panic, the date of which may be more easily determined than general cycle changes associated with other recessions.
1828–1829 recession	1828–1829	~1 year	~2 years	In 1826, the United Kingdom of Great Britain and Ireland banned US citizens from trading with British colonies, and in 1827, the United States adopted a counter-prohibition. Trade declined, just as credit became tight for manufacturers in New England.
1833–1834 recession	1833–1834	~1 year	~4 years	The United States' economy declined moderately in 1833–34. News accounts of the time confirm the slowdown. The subsequent expansion was driven by land speculation.

== Free Banking Era to the Great Depression (1836–1929) ==
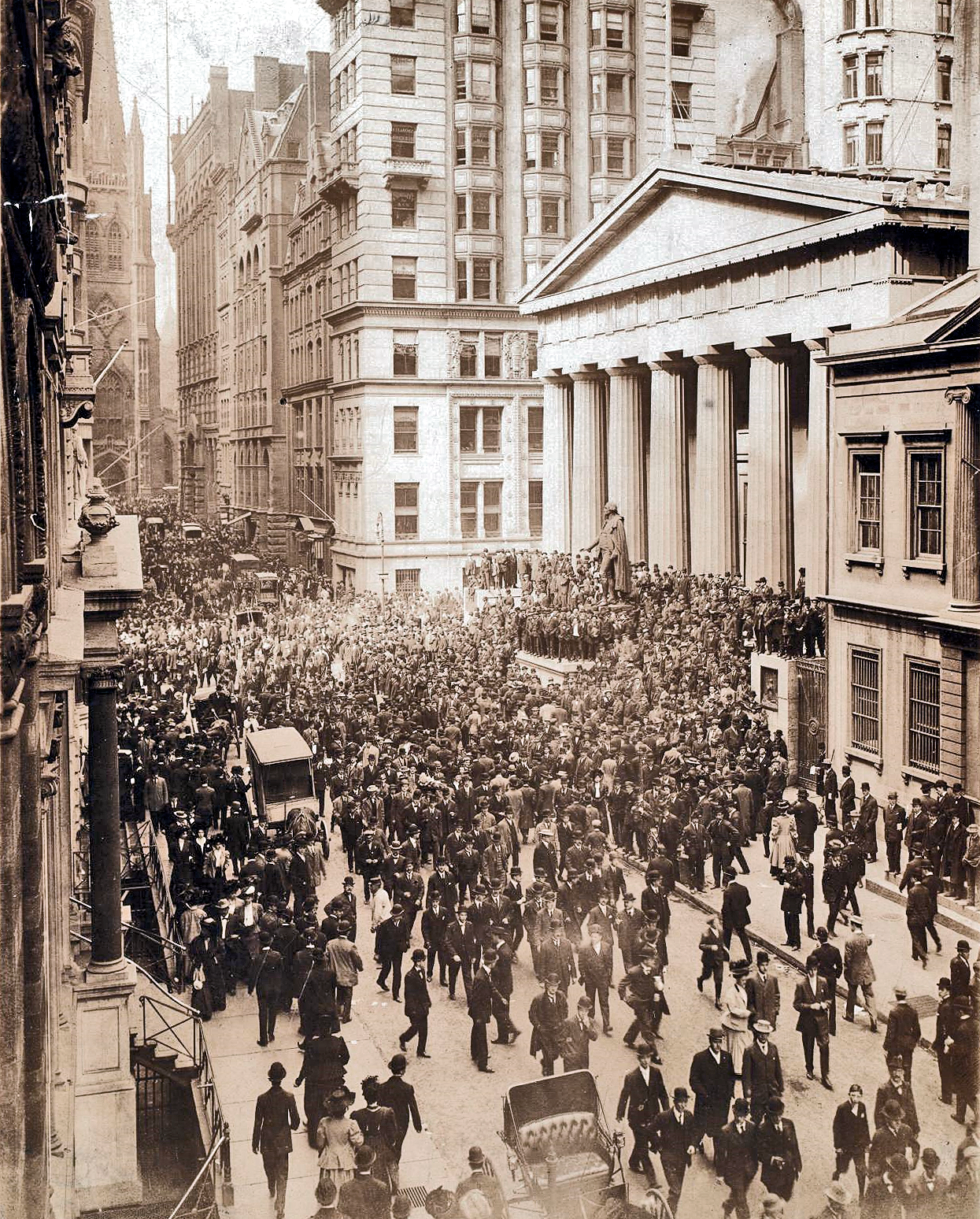
A swarm gathers on Wall Street during the Panic of 1907. Compared to today, the era from 1834 to the Great Depression was characterized by relatively severe and more frequent banking panics and recessions.

In the 1830s, U.S. President Andrew Jackson fought to end the Second Bank of the United States. Following the Bank War, the Second Bank lost its charter in 1836. From 1837 to 1862, there was no national presence in banking, but still plenty of state and even local regulation, such as laws against branch banking which prevented diversification. In 1863, in response to financing pressures of the Civil War, Congress passed the National Banking Act, creating nationally chartered banks. Since there was neither a central bank nor deposit insurance during this era, banking panics were common.

The dating of recessions during this period is controversial. Modern economic statistics, such as gross domestic product and unemployment, were not gathered during this period: Victor Zarnowitz evaluated a variety of indices to measure the severity of these recessions.

From 1834 to 1929, one measure of recessions is the Cleveland Trust Company index, which measured business activity and, beginning in 1882, an index of trade and industrial activity was available, which can be used to compare recessions. (Note: The peak to trough decline in business activity and trade and industrial activity during a given recession. From 1834 to 1882, Zarnowitz uses the Cleveland Trust Company index. Beginning in 1873, he uses a composite of three trend-adjusted indices – the Cleveland Trust Company Index, the Persons Index which begins in 1875 and a business activity index from AT&T Corporation beginning in 1877. For the Long Depression, both the Cleveland Trust Company index, and the composite are given. The index for trade and industrial activity is the Axe and Houghton Index, beginning in February 1879. It is based on pig iron production, bank clearings (outside New York City), import volume, and the revenue per mile earned by different railroads.)

Name	Dates	Duration	Time since previous recession	Business activity	Trade & industrial activity	Characteristics
1836–1838 recession	—	~2 years	~2 years	−32.8%	—	A sharp downturn in the American economy was caused by bank failures, lack of confidence in the paper currency, tightening of English Credit, crop failures and Jacksonian policy. Speculation markets were greatly affected when American banks stopped payment in specie (gold and silver coinage). Over 600 banks failed in this period. In the Southern United States, the cotton market completely collapsed. See: Panic of 1837.
late 1839–late 1843 recession	—	~4 years	~1 year	−34.3%	—	This was one of the longest and deepest depressions of the 19th century: it was a period of pronounced deflation and massive defaults on debt. The Cleveland Trust Company Index showed the economy spent 68 months below its trend, and only nine months above it, and declined 34.3% during this depression.
1845–late 1846 recession	—	~1 year	~2 years	−5.9%	—	This recession was mild enough that it may have only been a slowdown in the growth cycle. One theory holds that this would have been a recession, except the United States began to gear up for the Mexican–American War, which began April 25, 1846.
1847–1848 recession	late 1847 – late 1848	~1 year	~1 year	−19.7%	—	The Cleveland Trust Company Index declined 19.7% during 1847 and 1848. It is associated with the Panic of 1847, a financial crisis in Great Britain.
1853–1854 recession	1853 – December 1854	~1 year	~5 years	−18.4%	—	Interest rates rose in this period, contributing to a decrease in railroad investment. Security prices fell during this period. With the exception of falling business investment, there is little evidence of contraction in this period.
Panic of 1857	June 1857 – December 1858	1 year 6 months	2 years 6 months	−23.1%	—	The failure of the Ohio Life Insurance and Trust Company burst a European speculative bubble in United States' railroads and caused a loss of confidence in American banks. Over 5,000 businesses failed within the first year of the Panic, and unemployment was accompanied by protest meetings in urban areas. This recession was one of the main causes of the American Civil War, which would begin in 1861 and end in 1865. This is the earliest recession to which the NBER assigns specific months (rather than years) for the peak and trough.
1860–1861 recession	October 1860 – June 1861	8 months	1 year 10 months	−14.5%	—	There was a mild recession before the American Civil War, which began on April 12, 1861, although the recession was only limited to some areas. Zarnowitz says the data generally show a contraction occurred in this period, but it was quite mild. A financial panic was narrowly averted in 1860 by the first use of clearing house certificates between banks.
1865–1867 recession	April 1865 – December 1867	2 years 8 months	3 years 10 months	−23.8%	—	The American Civil War ended in April 1865, and the country entered a lengthy period of general deflation that lasted until 1896. The United States occasionally experienced periods of recession during the Reconstruction Era. Production increased in the years following the Civil War, but the country still had financial difficulties. The post-war period coincided with a period of some international financial instability.
1869–1870 recession	June 1869 – December 1870	1 year 6 months	1 year 6 months	−9.7%	—	A few years after the Civil War, a short recession occurred. It was unusual since it came amid a period when railroad investment was greatly accelerating, even producing the first transcontinental railroad. The railroads built in this period opened up the interior of the country, giving birth to the Farmers' movement. The recession may be explained partly by ongoing financial difficulties following the war, which discouraged businesses from building up inventories. Several months into the recession, there was a major financial panic.
Panic of 1873 and the Long Depression	October 1873 – March 1879	5 years 5 months	2 years 10 months	−33.6% (−27.3%)	—	Economic problems in Europe prompted the failure of Jay Cooke & Company, the largest bank in the United States, which burst the post-Civil War speculative bubble. The Coinage Act of 1873 also contributed by immediately depressing the price of silver, which hurt North American mining interests. The deflation and wage cuts of the era led to labor turmoil, such as the Great Railroad Strike of 1877. In 1879, the United States returned to the gold standard with the Specie Payment Resumption Act. This is the longest period of economic contraction recognized by the NBER, though the Long Depression is sometimes held to be the entire period from October 1873 to December 1896.
Depression of 1882–1885	March 1882 – May 1885	3 years 2 months	3 years	−32.8%	−24.6%	Like the Long Depression that preceded it, the recession of 1882–1885 was more of a price depression than a production depression. From 1879 to 1882, there had been a boom in railroad construction which came to an end, resulting in a decline in both railroad construction and in related industries, particularly iron and steel. A major economic event during the recession was the Panic of 1884.
1887–1888 recession	March 1887 – April 1888	1 year 1 month	1 year 10 months	−14.6%	−8.2%	Investments in railroads and buildings weakened during this period. This slowdown was so mild that it is not always considered a recession. Contemporary accounts apparently indicate it was considered a slight recession.
1890–1891 recession	July 1890 – May 1891	10 months	1 year 5 months	−22.1%	−11.7%	Although shorter than the recession in 1887–1888 and still modest, a slowdown in 1890–1891 was somewhat more pronounced than the preceding recession. International monetary disturbances are blamed for this recession, such as the Panic of 1890 in the United Kingdom.
Panic of 1893	January 1893 – June 1894	1 year 5 months	1 year 8 months	−37.3%	−29.7%	The failure of the United States Reading Railroad and withdrawal of European investment led to a stock market and banking collapse: this Panic was also precipitated in part by a run on the gold supply. The Treasury had to issue bonds to purchase enough gold. Profits, investment and income all fell, leading to political instability, the height of the U.S. populist movement and the Free Silver movement. Estimates on unemployment vary, it may have peaked anywhere from 8.2 to 18.4%.
Panic of 1896	December 1895 – June 1897	1 year 6 months	1 year 6 months	−25.2%	−20.8%	The period of 1893–1897 is seen as a generally depressed cycle that had a short spurt of growth in the middle, following the Panic of 1893. Production shrank and deflation reigned.
1899–1900 recession	June 1899 – December 1900	1 year 6 months	2 years	−15.5%	−8.8%	This was a mild recession in the period of general growth beginning after 1897. Evidence for a recession in this period does not show up in some annual data series.
1902–1904 recession	September 1902 – August 1904	1 year 11 months	1 year 9 months	−16.2%	−17.1%	Though not severe, this downturn lasted for nearly two years and saw a distinct decline in the national product. Industrial and commercial production both declined, albeit fairly modestly. The recession came about a year after a 1901 stock crash.
Panic of 1907	May 1907 – June 1908	1 year 1 month	2 years 9 months	−29.2%	−31.0%	A run on Knickerbocker Trust Company deposits on October 22, 1907, set events in motion that would lead to a severe monetary contraction. The fallout from the panic led to Congress creating the Federal Reserve System.
Panic of 1910–1911	January 1910 – January 1912	2 years	1 year 7 months	−14.7%	−10.6%	This was a mild but lengthy recession. The national product grew by less than 1%, and commercial activity and industrial activity declined. The period was also marked by deflation.
Recession of 1913–1914	January 1913 – December 1914	1 year 11 months	1 year	−25.9%	−19.8%	Productions and real income declined during this period and were not offset until the start of World War I increased demand. Incidentally, the Federal Reserve Act was signed during this recession, creating the Federal Reserve System, the culmination of a sequence of events following the Panic of 1907. The financial crisis of 1914 occurred following the assassination of Archduke Franz Ferdinand of Austria-Hungary, the subsequent July Crisis, and British declaration of war on Germany, which led to U.S. Treasury Secretary William Gibbs McAdoo to close the New York Stock Exchange beginning on July 31.
Post-World War I recession	August 1918 – March 1919	7 months	3 years 8 months	−24.5%	−14.1%	Severe hyperinflation in Europe took place over production in North America. This was a brief but very sharp recession and was caused by the end of wartime production, along with an influx of labor from returning troops. This, in turn, caused high unemployment.
Depression of 1920–1921	January 1920 – July 1921	1 year 6 months	10 months	−38.1%	−32.7%	The 1921 recession began a mere 10 months after the post-World War I recession, as the economy continued working through the shift to a peacetime economy. The recession was short, but extremely painful. The year 1920 was the single most deflationary year in American history; production, however, did not fall as much as might be expected from the deflation. GNP may have declined between 2.5 and 7 percent, even as wholesale prices declined by 36.8%. The economy had a strong recovery following the recession.
1923–1924 recession	May 1923 – June 1924	1 year 2 months	2 years	−25.4%	−22.7%	From the depression of 1920–1921 until the Great Depression, an era dubbed the Roaring Twenties, the economy was generally expanding. Industrial production declined in 1923–24, but on the whole this was a mild recession.
1926–1927 recession	October 1926 – November 1927	1 year 1 month	2 years 3 months	−12.2%	−10.0%	This was an unusual and mild recession, thought to be caused largely because Henry Ford closed production in his factories for six months to switch from production of the Model T to the Model A. Charles P. Kindleberger says the period from 1925 to the start of the Great Depression is best thought of as a boom, and this minor recession is just proof that the boom "was not general, uninterrupted or extensive".

== Great Depression onward (1929–present) ==
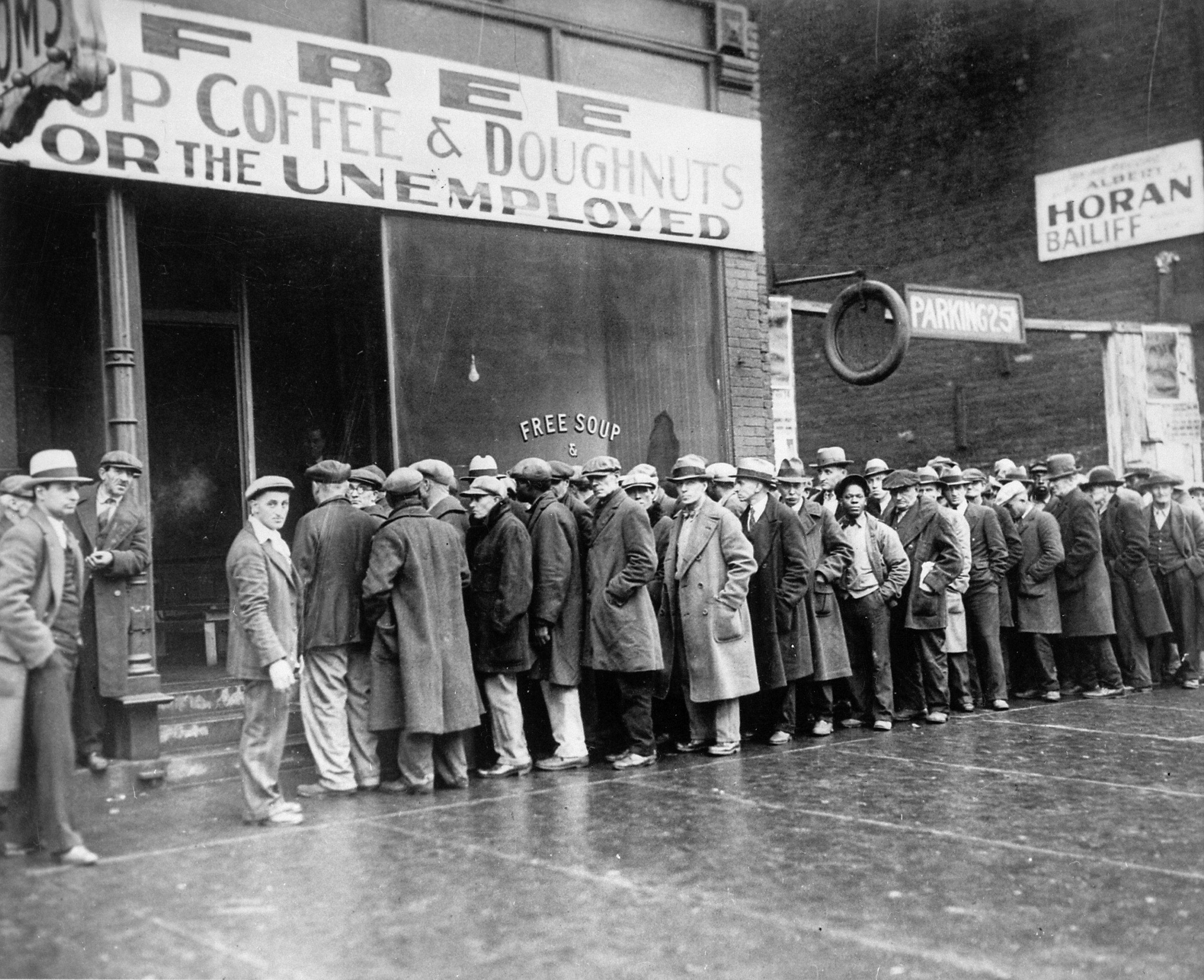
Unemployed men standing in line outside a depression soup kitchen in Chicago 1931. Following the severe Great Depression, the post-World War II economy has seen long expansions and, for the most part, less severe recessions than in earlier American history.

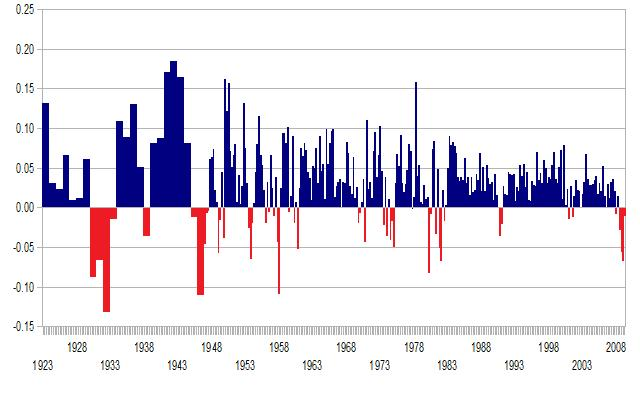
Annualized GDP change from 1923 to 2009. Data are annual from 1923 to 1946 and quarterly from 1947 to the second quarter of 2009.

Following the end of World War II and the large adjustment as the economy adjusted from wartime to peacetime in 1945, the collection of many economic indicators, such as unemployment and GDP, became standardized. Recessions after World War II may be compared to each other much more easily than previous recessions because of these available data. The listed dates and durations are from the official chronology of the National Bureau of Economic Research. GDP data are from the Bureau of Economic Analysis, unemployment from the Bureau of Labor Statistics (after 1948). The unemployment rate often reaches a peak associated with a recession after the recession has officially ended.

Until the start of the COVID-19 recession in 2020, no post-World War II era came anywhere near the depth of the Great Depression. In the Great Depression, GDP fell by 27% (the deepest after demobilization is the recession beginning in December 2007, during which GDP had fallen 5.1% by the second quarter of 2009) and the unemployment rate reached 24.9% (the highest since was the 10.8% rate reached during the 1981–1982 recession).

The National Bureau of Economic Research dates recessions on a monthly basis back to 1854; according to their chronology, from 1854 to 1919, there were 16 cycles. The average recession lasted 22 months, and the average expansion 27. From 1919 to 1945, there were six cycles; recessions lasted an average 18 months and expansions for 35. From 1945 to 2001, and 10 cycles, recessions lasted an average 10 months and expansions an average of 57 months. This has prompted some economists to declare that the business cycle has become less severe.

Many factors that may have contributed to this moderation including the establishment of deposit insurance in the form of the Federal Deposit Insurance Corporation in 1933 and increased regulation of the banking sector. Other changes include the use of fiscal policy in the form of automatic stabilizers to alleviate cyclical volatility. The creation of the Federal Reserve System in 1913 has been disputed as a source of stability with it and its policies having mixed successes. Since the early 1980s the sources of the Great Moderation has been attributed to numerous causes including public policy, industry practices, technology, and even good luck.

Name	Period Range	Duration	Time since previous recession	Peak unemployment	GDP decline (peak to trough)	Characteristics
Great Depression	August 1929 – March 1933	3 years 7 months	1 year 9 months	21.3% (1932)– 24.9% (1933)	−26.7%	A banking panic leading to the Wall Street crash of 1929 and a collapse in the money supply took place in the United States that was exacerbated by international commitment to the gold standard. Extensive new tariffs and other factors contributed to an extremely deep depression. GDP, industrial production, employment, and prices fell substantially. A small economic expansion within the depression began in 1933, with gold inflow expanding the money supply and improving expectations; the expansion would end in 1937. The ultimate recovery, which would occur with the start of World War II in 1940, was credited to monetary policy and monetary expansion.
Recession of 1937–1938	May 1937 – June 1938	1 year 1 month	4 years 2 months	17.8% −19.0% (1938)	−18.2%	The Recession of 1937 is only considered minor when compared to the Great Depression, but is otherwise among the worst recessions of the 20th century. Three explanations are offered as causes for the recession: the tight fiscal policy resulting from an attempt to balance the budget after New Deal spending; the tight monetary policy of the Federal Reserve; and the declining profits of businesses leading to a reduction in business investment.
Recession of 1945	February 1945 – October 1945	8 months	6 years 8 months	5.2% (1946)	−12.7%	The decline in government spending at the end of World War II led to an enormous drop in gross domestic product, making this technically a recession. This was the result of demobilization and the shift from a wartime to peacetime economy. The post-war years were unusual in a number of ways (unemployment was never high), and this era may be considered a "sui generis end-of-the-war recession".
Recession of 1949	November 1948 – October 1949	11 months	3 years 1 month	7.9% (October 1949)	−1.7%	The 1948 recession was a brief economic downturn; forecasters of the time expected much worse, perhaps influenced by the poor economy in their recent lifetimes. The recession also followed a period of monetary tightening.
Recession of 1953	July 1953 – May 1954	10 months	3 years 9 months	6.1% (September 1954)	−2.6%	After a post-Korean War inflationary period, more funds were transferred to national security. In 1951, the Federal Reserve reasserted its independence from the U.S. Treasury and in 1952, the Federal Reserve changed monetary policy to be more restrictive because of fears of further inflation or of a bubble forming.
Recession of 1958	August 1957 – April 1958	8 months	3 years 3 months	7.5% (July 1958)	−3.7%	Monetary policy was tightened during the two years preceding 1957, followed by an easing of policy at the end of 1957. The budget balance resulted in a change in budget surplus of 0.8% of GDP in 1957 to a budget deficit of 0.6% of GDP in 1958, and then to 2.6% of GDP in 1959.
Recession of 1960–1961	April 1960 – February 1961	10 months	2 years	7.1% (May 1961)	−1.6%	Another primarily monetary recession occurred after the Federal Reserve began raising interest rates in 1959. The government switched from deficit (or 2.6% in 1959) to surplus (of 0.1% in 1960). When the economy emerged from this short recession, it began the second-longest period of growth in NBER history.
Recession of 1969–1970	December 1969 – November 1970	11 months	8 years 10 months	6.1% (December 1970)	−0.6%	The relatively mild 1969 recession followed a lengthy expansion. At the end of the expansion, inflation was rising, possibly a result of increased deficits. This relatively mild recession coincided with an attempt to start closing the budget deficits of the Vietnam War (fiscal tightening) and the Federal Reserve raising interest rates (monetary tightening).
1973–1975 recession	November 1973 – March 1975	1 year 4 months	3 years	9.0% (May 1975)	−3.2%	The 1973 oil crisis, a quadrupling of oil prices by OPEC, coupled with the 1973–1974 stock market crash led to a stagflation recession in the United States.
1980 recession	January 1980 – July 1980	6 months	4 years 10 months	7.8% (July 1980)	−2.2%	The NBER considers a very short recession to have occurred in 1980, followed by a short period of growth and then a deep recession. Unemployment remained relatively elevated in between recessions. The recession began as the Federal Reserve, under Paul Volcker, raised interest rates dramatically to fight the inflation of the 1970s. The early 1980s are sometimes referred to as a "double-dip" or "W-shaped" recession.
1981–1982 recession	July 1981 – November 1982	1 year 4 months	1 year	10.8% (November 1982)	−2.7%	The Iranian Revolution sharply increased the price of oil around the world in 1979, causing the 1979 energy crisis. This was caused by the new regime in power in Iran, which exported oil at inconsistent intervals and at a lower volume, forcing prices up. Tight monetary policy in the United States to control inflation led to another recession. The changes were made largely because of inflation carried over from the previous decade because of the 1973 oil crisis and the 1979 energy crisis.
Early 1990s recession	July 1990 – March 1991	8 months	7 years 8 months	7.8% (June 1992)	−1.4%	After the lengthy peacetime expansion of the 1980s, inflation began to increase and the Federal Reserve responded by raising interest rates from 1986 to 1989. This weakened but did not stop growth, but some combination of the subsequent 1990 oil price shock, the debt accumulation of the 1980s, and growing consumer pessimism combined with the weakened economy to produce a brief recession.
Early 2000s recession	March 2001 – November 2001	8 months	10 years	6.3% (June 2003)	−0.3%	The 1990s were the longest period of economic growth in American history up to that point. The collapse of the speculative dot-com bubble, a fall in business outlays and investments, and the September 11th attacks, brought the decade of growth to an end. Despite these major shocks, the recession was brief and shallow.
Great Recession	December 2007 – June 2009	1 year 6 months	6 years 1 month	10.0% (October 2009)	−5.1%	The subprime mortgage crisis led to the collapse of the United States housing bubble. Falling housing-related assets contributed to the 2008 financial crisis, even as oil and food prices soared. The crisis led to the failure or collapse of many of the United States' largest financial institutions: Bear Stearns, Fannie Mae, Freddie Mac, Lehman Brothers, and AIG, as well as a crisis in the automobile industry. The government responded with an unprecedented $700 billion bank bailout and $787 billion fiscal stimulus package. The National Bureau of Economic Research declared the end of this recession over a year after the end date. The Dow Jones Industrial Average (Dow) finally reached its lowest point on March 9, 2009.
COVID-19 recession	February 2020 – April 2020	2 months	10 years 8 months	14.7% (April 2020)	−19.2%	The economic effects of the pandemic were severe after the first quarter of 2020. More than 24 million people lost jobs in the United States in just three weeks in April. The economic impact of the virus is still being determined, but the recession was the shortest on record.

== See also ==
- Criticism of the Federal Reserve
- Inverted yield curve
- List of economic expansions in the United States
- List of recessions in Canada
- List of recessions in the United Kingdom
- List of stock market crashes and bear markets
- Sahm rule - economic indicator predicting recessions

== Sources ==
- Glasner, David; Cooley, Thomas F., eds. (1997). Business cycles and depressions: an encyclopedia. New York: Garland Publishing. ISBN 978-0-8240-0944-1.
- Gordon, Robert J., ed. (1986). The American Business Cycle: Continuity and Change. UMI. ISBN 978-0-226-30452-6.
- Knoop, Todd A. (2004). Recessions and Depressions: Understanding Business Cycles. Praeger Publishers. ISBN 978-0-275-98162-4.
- US Business Cycle Expansions and Contractions, National Bureau of Economic Research. Retrieved on September 19, 2009.
- Zarnowitz, Victor (1996). Business Cycles: Theory, History, Indicators, and Forecasting. Chicago: University of Chicago Press. ISBN 978-0-226-97891-8.
