= Rolling recession =

A rolling recession, or rolling adjustment recession, occurs when the recession only affects certain sectors of the economy at a time. As one sector enters recovery, the slowdown will ‘roll’ into another part of the economy. On the whole, rolling recessions occur regardless of nationwide or statewide economic recession, and the effects may not be in the national economic measures (e.g., gross domestic product (GDP)). The recession of 1960–61 in the United States is an example of a rolling-adjustment recession.

== See also ==
- Recession shapes
- List of recessions in the United States
- List of recessions in the United Kingdom
