= List of economic expansions in the United States =

In the United States the unofficial beginning and ending dates of national economic expansions have been defined by an American private non-profit research organization known as the National Bureau of Economic Research (NBER). The NBER defines an expansion as a period when economic activity rises substantially, spreads across the economy, and typically lasts for several years.

During the 19th century, the United States experienced frequent boom and bust cycles. This period was characterized by short, frequent periods of expansion, typically punctuated by periods of sharp recession. This cyclical pattern continued through the Great Depression. Economic growth since 1945 has been more stable with fewer recessions when compared to previous eras.

== Great Depression onward ==
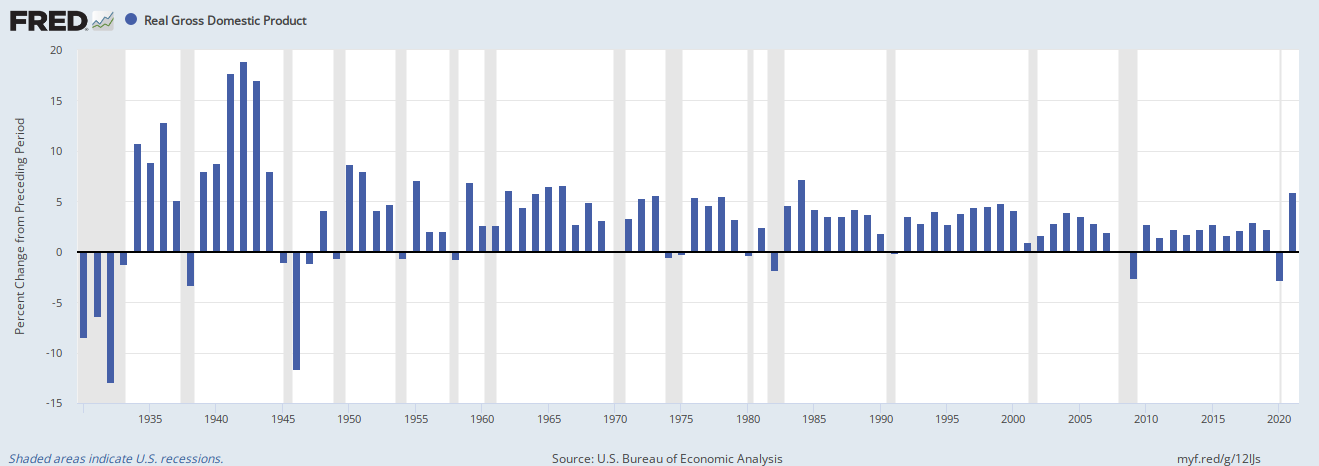
Annual Real Gross Domestic Product Growth Rate — 1930 through 2022

Following the end of World War II and the large adjustment as the economy adjusted from wartime to peacetime in 1945, the collection of many economic indicators, such as unemployment and gross domestic product (GDP) became standardized. Expansions after World War II may be compared to each other much more easily than previous expansions because of these available data. The listed dates and durations are from the official chronology of the National Bureau of Economic Research.

The National Bureau of Economic Research dates expansions on a monthly basis. From the trough of the recession of 1945 to the late-2000s recession, there have been eleven periods of expansion, lasting an average of fifty-nine months.

Included during this period is the post–World War II economic expansion through the 1973–75 recession, a period of stagflation between 1974 and 1981, and the Great Moderation from 1982 to the start of the late-2000s recession.

Dates	Duration (months)	Annual Employment Growth	Annual GDP Growth	Description
Oct 1945– Nov 1948	37	+5.2%	+1.5%	As the United States demobilized from World War II, the decline in government spending caused a brief recession in 1945 and suppressed GDP growth for several years thereafter. However, private economic activity expanded at a brisk pace throughout this period. The expansion lasted just over three years, followed by another brief recession in late 1948.
Oct 1949– July 1953	45	+4.4%	+6.9%	The United States exited recession in late 1949, and another robust expansion began. This expansion coincided with the Korean War, after which the Federal Reserve initiated more restrictive monetary policy. The slowdown in economic activity led to the recession of 1953, bringing an end to nearly four years of expansion.
May 1954– Aug 1957	39	+2.5%	+4.0%	Expansion resumed following a return to growth in May 1954. Employment and GDP growth slowed relative to the previous two expansions.
April 1958– April 1960	24	+3.6%	+5.6%	A brief, two-year period of expansion occurred between 1958 and 1960, followed by another monetary recession in 1960.
Feb 1961– Dec 1969	106	+3.3%	+4.9%	A long expansionary period began in 1961. Incomes and employment rose, while poverty fell sharply. The ongoing Vietnam War contributed to expansive fiscal policy, at the cost of rising inflation as the 1960s drew to a close.
Nov 1970– Nov 1973	36	+3.4%	+5.1%	Growth resumed after the brief recession of 1969–70, but ended abruptly with the 1973 oil crisis. Inflation remained stubbornly high, and would soon rise to double digits despite stagnating growth, a phenomenon that came to be known as stagflation.
Mar 1975– Jan 1980	58	+3.6%	+4.3%	Following the steep recession between 1973 and 1975, an expansion occurred through the remainder of the decade. Inflation remained high during this period and energy prices were a particular sore point. The expansion ended with a second energy crisis, which saw oil prices reach an all-time peak that would not be surpassed in real terms until 2008. This expansion was followed by a short recession, triggered in part by the Federal Reserve's decision to combat rising prices by raising interest rates.
Jul 1980– Jul 1981	12	+2.0%	+4.4%	This short period of growth saw unemployment remain relatively high, particularly among manufacturing and construction workers, never dropping below 7.2%. Rebounding inflation after an initial decline spurred the Fed to continue monetary tightening, which led to another recession after only a year. The period from 1980 to 1982 is sometimes referred to as a double-dip recession.
Dec 1982– July 1990	92	+2.8%	+4.3%	Inflation was under control by the mid-1980s. Influenced by low and stable oil prices in combination with a steep rise in private investment and rising incomes, the economy entered what was at the time the second longest peacetime economic expansion in U.S. history.
Mar 1991– Mar 2001	120	+2.0%	+3.6%	Following a mild recession in the early 1990s, the U.S. entered the second-longest period of economic expansion in its history. Job growth remained weak at first, hampered by mass layoffs in defense-related industries following the end of the Cold War. Construction hiring was also weak, and real estate values subdued, following a period of overbuilding in the 1980s. Economic growth solidified by 1993, and home prices rebounded starting in 1995. The latter half of the period saw the rise of the dot-com bubble, as personal computers and internet access became widely available. Eager to profit from these new technologies and fueled by low interest rates and a 1997 tax cut on capital gains, investors drove stock valuations to record highs. In a move to protect the broader economy from the over-inflated stock market, the Fed began raising interest rates in 1999, culminating in a market crash and a string of high-profile bankruptcies beginning the following year.
Nov 2001– Dec 2007	73	+0.9%	+2.8%	Another mild recession occurred in 2001, followed by moderate expansion. Persistently high unemployment and slow wage growth sparked complaints of a "jobless recovery", though unemployment eventually fell below 5% by 2005. Meanwhile, the rise in home prices that began in the mid-1990s grew into a real estate bubble. Home construction boomed, while low interest rates and loosened lending standards allowed homeowners to easily withdraw equity, boosting consumer spending and job growth. Though the housing market entered a correction in early 2006, the effects on economic growth were initially muted. However, mortgage defaults spiked starting in 2007 and the banking industry began to destabilize, leading to the subprime mortgage crisis. A deep recession began at the end of that year, bringing an end to the Great Moderation, a period of stable economic expansion and employment growth that began in the early 1980s.
June 2009– Feb 2020	128	+1.1%	+2.3%	The effects of the Great Recession of 2007-2009 continued to be felt for years, with the economy described as a "malaise" as late as 2011. Employment growth remained historically low, and unemployment would not return to pre-recession levels until 2016. Long-term unemployment rose to a record high while labor force participation fell off sharply as many of the unemployed gave up looking for work. In an effort to spur economic growth, the Federal Reserve engaged in three rounds of quantitative easing, while the federal funds rate was kept near zero for an unprecedented seven years. However, credit remained difficult to obtain for some time, as lending institutions used the newly created cash to shore up their balance sheets. What growth occurred was unevenly distributed; roughly half of GDP growth from 2009 to 2015 went to the top 1% of households. Unlike every previous post-war expansion, GDP growth remained under 3% for every calendar year. Global growth would peak in 2017, resulting in a major synchronized slowdown that started in 2018. The following year, the unemployment rate fell below 3.5% and a major spike in the repo market occurred, prompting fears of a recession. The expansion would end in March 2020 due to the novel coronavirus which caused a pandemic that resulted in the 2020 stock market crash.
April 2020- TBD	TBD	TBD	TBD	The COVID-19 recession proved to be the shortest recession in US history but had the largest GDP decline since the 1945 recession. The short-term economic effects of the COVID-19 pandemic included supply chain shortages, the collapse of many service and hospitality industries, and a dramatic rise in unemployment. Long-term effects include a sustained rise in inflation and a brief banking crisis in 2023.

== See also ==
- List of recessions in the United States
