= List of recessions in Canada =

Although Canada's economy is closely linked to the United States' economy, Canadian and American recessions do not always coincide. A recession is generally defined as two successive quarters of negative economic growth.

List of Recessions in Canada
Name	Start	End	Cause
The Great Depression	April 1929	February 1933	Wall Street crash of 1929; collapse in global commodity prices; Prairie drought; U.S. Smoot–Hawley Tariff Act
Recession of 1937–1938	November 1937	June 1938	Premature withdrawal of U.S. New Deal fiscal stimulus; renewed Prairie drought
Recession of 1949	August 1947	March 1948	Post-World War II economic readjustment as wartime production wound down
Recession of 1951	April 1951	December 1951	Korean War economic cycle; inflationary pressures prompted monetary tightening
Recession of 1953	July 1953	July 1954	End of Korean War cut defence spending; U.S. slowdown reduced export demand
Recession of 1958	March 1957	January 1958	U.S. recession reduced demand for Canadian exports; drop in business investment
Recession of 1960–1961	March 1960	March 1961	Tight monetary policy; U.S. recession dampened Canadian export demand
1973–1975 recession	October 1974	March 1975	1973 oil crisis following the Yom Kippur War; resulting stagflation
Early 1980s recession in the United States	June 1981	October 1982	Bank of Canada interest rate hikes to fight inflation (Volcker shock); 1979 energy crisis
Early 1990s recession	March 1990	May 1992	Bank of Canada tightening raised interest rates and the dollar; manufacturing losses following the Canada–U.S. FTA (1989)
Great Recession	October 2008	May 2009	Financial crisis of 2007–2008 originating in U.S. housing and banking sectors
2015 Technical Recession	April 2015	September 2015	Global oil price collapse from mid-2014 due to oversupply; severe contraction in Alberta's energy sector
COVID-19 recession	February 2020	2021	COVID-19 pandemic in Canada; lockdowns, travel restrictions, and supply chain disruptions

== See also ==
- Economic history of Canada
- List of recessions in the United Kingdom
- List of recessions in the United States
