= List of recessions in the United Kingdom =

This is a list of recessions (and depressions) that have affected the economy of the United Kingdom and its predecessor states. In the United Kingdom a recession is generally defined as two successive quarters of negative economic growth, as measured by the seasonally adjusted quarter-on-quarter figures for real GDP.

Name	Dates	Duration	Real GDP reduction	Causes	Other data
Great Slump	c. 1430 – c. 1490	c. 60 years		Economic blockades during the Hundred Years' War and the Great Bullion Famine	
War of the Spanish Succession	1706		−15%	War of the Spanish Succession compounded by failure of harvest	
The Great Frost	1709	3 months	−14%	Failure of harvest caused by the Great Frost	
Crisis of 1772	1772			Great Bengal famine of 1770	
Post-Napoleonic Depression	1812–1821	c. 9 years		Post-Napoleonic Wars readjustment	
1857–58 recession	1857–58	c. 1 year	c. 1%	Panic of 1857 (originating in America) as the first global economic crisis, confidence eroded by Palmerston government relaxing the provisions of the Bank Charter Act 1844	Comparatively brief contraction of approximately 3.5% nominal GDP?
1867–1869 recession	1867–1869	c. 2 years	c. 1%	Impact on exports resulting from American recession post-American Civil War	1.9% fall in GDP
Long Depression	1873–1896	Periodic falls in real GDP over c. 20 years	Deflation but a large rise real GDP	Panic of 1873	Previously known as the "Great Depression". Real GDP rose over this period. Agricultural deflation hit farmers and their workers, although industrial output continued to grow.
1919–1926 depression	1919–1921	c. 3 years	1919 −10.9%; 1920 – 6.0%; 1921 – 8.1%; 9.5%	The end of World War I	Deflation c. 10% in 1921, and c. 14% in 1922.
Great Depression	1930–31	c. 2 years	1930: −0.7%; 1931: −5.1%	US Depression. Reducing demand for UK exports, also high interest rate defending the gold standard.	UK came off gold standard September 1931. 3–5% deflation pa. UK much less affected than US. Took 16 quarters for GDP to recover to that at start of recession after a 'double dip'.
1956 recession	1956 Q2; 1956 Q3	0.5 years (2 Qtrs)	1956 Q2: −0.2%; 1956 Q3: −0.1%	Uncompetitive motor industry, inflationary pressures, credit squeeze caused by high bank rate, effects of the Suez crisis – oil embargo by NATO and other Arab countries.	Average inflation in 1956 totalled 4.9%. Interest rate held at 5.5%, an increase of 1.0% on the previous year.
1961 recession	1961 Q3; 1961 Q4	0.5 years (2 Qtrs)	1961 Q3: −0.5%; 1961 Q4: −0.2%	Time lag from the 'Rolling Adjustment' recession in America and high bank rate.	Interest rates were hiked from 5.0% to 7.0% in July 1961, reducing to 6.5% in October 1961 and then to 6.0% from November 1961 onwards.
Mid-1970s recessions	1973 Q3; 1973 Q4; 1974 Q1	0.75 years (3 Qtrs)	1973 Q3: −1.0%; 1973 Q4: −0.4%; 1974 Q1: −2.7%	1973 oil crisis, stagflation, the decline of traditional British industries, inefficient production, high inflation caused industrial disputes over pay.	The economy surpassed its pre-recession peak by 1976 Q4, fourteen quarters after its beginning. There were two single-quarterly setbacks during the recovery (aside from the double-dip) in 1974 Q4 and 1976 Q2. Average inflation was 9.2% in 1973, 16.0% in 1974, 24.2% in 1975 and 16.5% in 1976. Interest rates fluctuated wildly during the recession with a low of 9.0% in March 1976 and a high of 15.0% in October 1976.
Mid-1970s recessions	1975 Q2; 1975 Q3	0.5 years (2 Qtrs)	1975 Q2: −1.7%; 1975 Q3: −0.3%	1973 oil crisis, stagflation, the decline of traditional British industries, inefficient production, high inflation caused industrial disputes over pay.	The economy surpassed its pre-recession peak by 1976 Q4, fourteen quarters after its beginning. There were two single-quarterly setbacks during the recovery (aside from the double-dip) in 1974 Q4 and 1976 Q2. Average inflation was 9.2% in 1973, 16.0% in 1974, 24.2% in 1975 and 16.5% in 1976. Interest rates fluctuated wildly during the recession with a low of 9.0% in March 1976 and a high of 15.0% in October 1976.
Early 1980s recession	1980 Q1; 1980 Q2; 1980 Q3; 1980 Q4; 1981 Q1	1.25 years (5 Qtr)	1980 Q1: −1.7%; 1980 Q2: −2.0%; 1980 Q3: −0.2%; 1980 Q4: −1.0%; 1981 Q1: −0.3%	Deflationary government policies including spending cuts, pursuance of monetarism to reduce inflation, switch from a manufacturing economy to a services economy.	Company earnings decline 35%. Unemployment rises from 5.3% of the working population in August 1979 to 11.9% in 1984. Took thirteen quarters for GDP to recover to its pre-recession peak at the end of 1979. Annual inflation was 18.0% in 1980, 11.9% in 1981, 8.6% in 1982 and 4.6% in 1983. Interest rates generally declined during the recession from a peak of 17.0% at the beginning of 1980 to a low of 9.6% in October 1982.
Early 1990s recession	1990 Q3; 1990 Q4; 1991 Q1; 1991 Q2; 1991 Q3	1.25 years (5 Qtrs)	1990 Q3: −1.1%; 1990 Q4: −0.4%; 1991 Q1: −0.3%; 1991 Q2: −0.2%; 1991 Q3: −0.3%	US savings and loan crisis, high bank rate in response to rising inflation caused by the Lawson Boom and to maintain British membership of the European Exchange Rate Mechanism.	Company earnings decline 25%. Peak budget deficit c. 8% of GDP. Unemployment rises from 6.9% of the working population in 1990 to 10.7% in 1993. Took eleven quarters for GDP to recover to its pre-recession peak in the Spring of 1990. Annual inflation was 9.5% in 1990, 5.9% in 1991, 3.7% in 1992. and 1.6% in 1993. Interest rates were stubbornly high initially but declined from a high of 14.8% at the start of the recession to a low of 5.9% by the end of the recession, though interest rates were hiked twice during Black Wednesday.
Great Recession	2008 Q2; 2008 Q3; 2008 Q4; 2009 Q1; 2009 Q2	1.25 years (5 Qtrs)	2008 Q2: −0.2%; 2008 Q3: −1.7%; 2008 Q4: −2.2%; 2009 Q1: −1.8%; 2009 Q2: −0.3%	2008 financial crisis, rising global commodity prices, subprime mortgage crisis infiltrating the British banking sector, significant credit crunch.	The recession lasted for five quarters and was the deepest UK recession since the Second World War. Manufacturing output declined 7% by end 2008. It affected many sectors including banks and investment firms, with many well known and established businesses having to fold. The unemployment rate rose to 8.3% (2.68m people) in August 2011, the highest level since 1994. There was much speculation of a 'double dip' recession during the 2010s, but this proved not to be the case. However, the 2010s saw four separate periods of quarter-on-quarter fall in growth: 2010 Q4 (−0.4); 2011 Q4 (−0.1); 2012 Q2 (−0.5); and 2012 Q4 (−0.2).
COVID-19 recession	2020 Q1; 2020 Q2	0.5 years (2 Qtrs)	2020 Q1: −2.6%; 2020 Q2: −18.8%	COVID-19 pandemic	Majority of the decrease in GDP occurred in March and April 2020 and was followed by a sharp increase in June and July although GDP did not return to pre-pandemic levels until late 2021. The drop, while brief, was the deepest recession since 1709. The event triggered an inflationary shock and a wider cost of living crisis.
2023 recession	2023 Q3; 2023 Q4	0.5 years (2 Qtrs)	2023 Q3: -0.1%; 2023 Q4: -0.3%	A rise in economically inactive people in the wake of the COVID-19 pandemic, attributed to long term sickness levels, and a decline in school attendance which may also be driven by sickness rates.	GDP per capita began to fall in Q2 2022, the longest run of falls or stagnation by that metric since 1955. By February 2024 GDP per capita had shrunk by 4.2% compared to its pre- cost of living crisis peak. The growth in population from record-high immigration had offset this decline in the overall GDP statistics in 2022 and early 2023.

== See also ==
- List of recessions in Canada
- List of recessions in the United States
- Stock market crashes in India
- List of stock market crashes and bear markets
- Office for National Statistics
