= Depression of 1882–1885 =

Economic recession in the United States

November 1882 news item from the London Guardian noting the expanding financial crisis in the United States, marked by a continued "railway war."

The Depression of 1882–1885, or Recession of 1882–1885, was an economic contraction in the United States that lasted from March 1882 to May 1885, according to the National Bureau of Economic Research. Lasting 38 months, it was the third-longest recession in the NBER's chronology of business cycles since 1854. Only the Great Depression (1929–1939) and the Long Depression (1873–1879) were longer.

== History ==
=== Origin ===
The Depression of 1882–1885 was not inaugurated by financial disaster or mass panic, but was rather an economic downturn that came about through a protracted and gradual process. The downturn was preceded by a period of prosperity over the years 1879 to 1882, a growth powered by expansion of the American railroad industry and the opening of economic opportunities associated with the development of the transportation system. During this interval annual railroad construction quadrupled, growing from 2,665 miles (4,289 km) in 1878 to 11,569 miles (18,619 km) in 1882. According to one 1997 estimate, the expansion of this sector represented a full 15% of American capital formation during the decade of the 1880s.

In addition, the United States experienced a favorable international balance of trade during the 1879–1882 period of growth — a fact which had the effect of expanding the country's money supply, facilitating credit and investment.

Comparison of major 19th and early 20th century recessions
Downturn	Length	Business activity
1873–1879	65 mos.	-33.6%
1882–1885	38 mos.	-32.8%
1893–1894	17 mos.	-37.3%
1907–1908	13 mos.	-29.2%
1921–1922	18 mos.	-38.1%

In 1882 this trend reversed, resulting in a decline in railroad construction and a decline in related industries, particularly iron and steel. Mismanagement and rate wars negatively affected profitability and the luster of railroads as an investment was dulled; money dried up and construction of new lines was negatively impacted, falling from 11,569 miles in 1882 to 6,741 miles in 1883.

=== Panic of 1884 ===
A major economic event during the recession was the Panic of 1884.

The 1884 downturn was severe with an estimated 5% of all American factories and mines completely shuttered during the 12 months running from July 1, 1884, to July 1, 1885. In addition another 5% of such enterprises were said to have closed down for part of the year. Approximately 1 million American workers were out of work during this economic trough.

=== Causes ===
Like the Long Depression that preceded it, the Depression of 1882–85 was more of a price depression than a production depression — in that prices and wage rates contracted while gross output remained more or less constant.

Contemporary observers were baffled by the downturn and agents of the fledgling U.S. Bureau of Labor Statistics conducted extensive surveys on the matter. In a published report by Commissioner of Labor Carroll D. Wright, it was found that explanation of the 1882 depression varied greatly according to the profession of the observer, with bankers and merchants tending to blame financial or commercial reasons, members of the clergy tending to blame social causes combined with divine providence, manufacturers apt to blame regulatory causes and the wage demands of workers, and workers tending to identify overproduction due to the introduction of new labor-saving machinery and low wage levels that made it impossible to consume the full amount of output.

A lengthy alphabetical list of causes claimed by survey respondents was compiled by the Bureau, which included, among other proposed factors, defects in the banking system, place of credit in agriculture, the use of child labor, the negative effects of corporate monopoly, a lack of public confidence in the future of the economy, expansion of the role of silver in the money system due to an unequal price ratio between gold and silver, excessive immigration, the expanded use of labor-saving machinery, a growth of speculative investment and market manipulation, the decline of railway construction, negative effects of a high tariff policy, and the growing consolidation of wealth in the hands of a comparative few.

=== Legacy ===
Economic data from the era are very spotty. Much of what is known comes from the reporting of the business newspaper the Commercial & Financial Chronicle. In terms of severity, according to Victor Zarnowitz, indexes of business activity show that the recession was not as severe as the declines in 1873, 1893, and 1921, but was more severe than the other recessions between the American Civil War and the Great Depression. At 38 months in length this is the third-longest recession in the NBER's chronology of business cycles from 1854 to present. Only the Great Depression and Long Depression of 1873–1879 are longer.

== See also ==
- List of recessions in the United States
