= Chandrakant Sampat =

Indian investor (1929–2015)

- Born: 1929; Gujarat, India
- Died: 2015 (aged 85–86); Mumbai, India
- Occupation: Investor
- Known for: Being the father of value investing in India

Chandrakant Sampat (1929–2015) was an Indian investor. He amassed his fortune by picking up multinational companies before other investors realized the true value in the 1970s and became known as the "Father of Value Investing in India".

== Early life ==
He was born in 1929 in a Gujarati family. After leaving his family business in the 1950s, he started investing in the Indian market at the age of 26.

== Career ==
After the Foreign Exchange Regulation Act (FERA) came into effect in the 1970s, he amassed a fortune by picking up multinational companies before other investors realized the true value of companies that reduced their equity to below their intrinsic value. Known as the "Father of Value Investing in India", Chandrakant Sampat inspired an entire generation of investors. He was a man of determination and strict discipline, which made him one of the biggest investors in India.

He is said to have inspired and guided many Indian investors, including the founder and owner of D-Mart retail chain and value investor Radhakishan Damani. He was compared to Warren Buffett for his successful investment strategy.

== Death ==
The 86-year-old investor led an active, simple life. Sampat died in 2015 at the age of 86.

== See also ==
- Stock Market Crash
- List of economic crises
