= Panic of 1847 =

Minor British banking crisis

The Panic of 1847 was a major British commercial and banking crisis, possibly triggered by the announcement in early March 1847 of government borrowing to pay for relief to combat the Great Famine in Ireland. It is also associated with the end of the 1840s railway industry boom and the failure of many non-bank lenders. The crisis was composed of two phases, one in April 1847 and one in October 1847, which was more serious and known as 'The Week of Terror'.

== Background ==
As an attempt at stabilizing the British economy, the government, led by Prime Minister Robert Peel, passed the Bank Charter Act 1844. This act fixed a maximum quantity of Bank of England banknotes that could be in circulation at any one time, and guaranteed that definite reserve funds of gold and silver would be held in reserve to back up the money in circulation. Furthermore, the act required that the supply of money in circulation could be increased only when gold or silver reserves were proportionately increased after the fiduciary allowance. The Bank of England and the British currency were therefore at risk from drains of gold leaving the country or being withdrawn internally, which reduced the backing for its banknotes. In 1847, heavy drains occurred, and the act was 'suspended' when the Bank of England was presented with a letter from the government indemnifying the Bank for a breach of the act. The crisis in the money market ended almost immediately, without any breach of the Act.

The panic of 1847 cleared away a vast number of business houses and commercial firms, documented at the time by David Morier Evans, a correspondent for The Times.

== Progress of the crises ==
From around £15m at the beginning of 1847, the bullion reserve of the Bank of England drained away, falling particularly sharply after the announcement of the Irish loan on 1 March 1847 to a trough of around £9m on 17 April 1847. The Bank's reserve of notes it could legally circulate also reached low levels. On 17 April 1847 it was announced that the cost of famine relief would be transferred to local taxes in Ireland and the bullion reserve and note reserve began to rise. However, capital outflows for investment in America and to pay for food imports to the United Kingdom overwhelmed the recovery, and both measures reached new low levels by October 1847. Recovery only commenced when the government 'suspended' the Bank Charter Act 1844 by the letter from the Prime Minister and Chancellor of the Exchequer to the Governor of the Bank dated 25 October 1847.

== Explanations ==
Supporters of the gold standard and Monetarist theory have sought to minimize the impact of the 1847 crisis and relate it to the money supply. In particular, Neville Ward-Perkins described the crisis as artificial and overemphasized by those who had a direct interest. The following explanation by Spanish economist Jesus Huerta de Soto of the Austrian School is based in the Austrian Theory of the Business Cycle:

As of 1840 credit expansion resumed in the United Kingdom and spread throughout France and the United States. Thousands of miles of railroad track were built and the stock market entered upon a period of relentless growth which mostly favored railroad stock. Thus began a speculative movement which lasted until 1846, when economic crisis hit in Great Britain. It is interesting to note that on July 19, 1844, under the auspices of Peel, England had adopted the Bank Charter Act, which represented the triumph of Ricardo’s Currency School and prohibited the issuance of bills not completely backed by gold. Nevertheless this provision was not established in relation to deposits and loans, the volume of which increased five fold in only two years, which explains the spread of speculation and the severity of the crisis which erupted in 1846.

Other explanations focus on the Banking School theory of financial crises, and relate the crisis to the Bank of England's management of interest rates, particularly in the situation of the apprehension in the money markets to the raising of the Irish loan.

== Outcomes ==
David Morier Evans listed over 450 firms that failed between August 1847 and December 1848.

Frustrated that plans for a loan to relieve the Irish famine had failed, Henry Grey, 3rd Earl Grey developed his plans for an alternative currency system to the Bank of England central bank model. It became known as a currency board and Grey set up the first one in cooperation with James Wilson and the Mauritian colonial government in Mauritius.

== See also ==
- Gold standard – Monetary system based on the value of gold
- Great Depression – Worldwide economic depression (1929–1939)
- Long Depression – Worldwide economic recession from 1873 to 1879
