= Long Depression =

Worldwide economic recession from 1873 to 1879

The Long Depression was a worldwide price and economic recession, beginning in 1873 and lasting until either March 1879, or the year 1899, depending on the metrics used. It was most severe in Europe and North America, which had been experiencing strong economic growth fueled by the Second Industrial Revolution. The episode was labeled the "Great Depression" at the time, and it held that designation until the Great Depression of the 1930s. Though it marked a period of general deflation and recession, it did not have the severe economic retrogression of the later Great Depression.

The United Kingdom of Great Britain and Ireland was the hardest hit; during this period it lost some of its large industrial lead over the economies of continental Europe. While it was occurring, the view was prominent that the British economy had been in continuous depression from 1873 to as late as 1896 and some texts refer to the period as the Great Depression of 1873–1896, with financial and manufacturing losses reinforced by a long recession in the agricultural sector.

In the United States, historians refer to the long depression as the Depression of 1873–1879, focusing on the Panic of 1873 and the Panic of 1893. The U.S. National Bureau of Economic Research (NBER) dates the contraction following the panic as lasting from October 1873 to March 1879. At 65 months, it is the longest-lasting contraction identified by the NBER, eclipsing the Great Depression's 43 months of contraction. In the United States, from 1873 to 1879, 18,000 businesses went bankrupt, including 89 railroads. Unemployment peaked in 1878 at 8.25%.

== Background ==
The period preceding the depression was dominated by several major military conflicts and a period of economic expansion. In Europe, the end of the Franco-Prussian War yielded a new political order in Germany, and the £200 million indemnity imposed on France led to an inflationary investment boom in Germany and Central Europe. New technologies in industry such as the Bessemer converter were being rapidly applied; railroads were booming. In the United States, the end of the Civil War and a brief post-war recession (1865–1867) gave way to an investment boom, focused especially on railroads on public lands in the Western United States – an expansion funded largely by foreign investors.

== Causes of the crisis ==
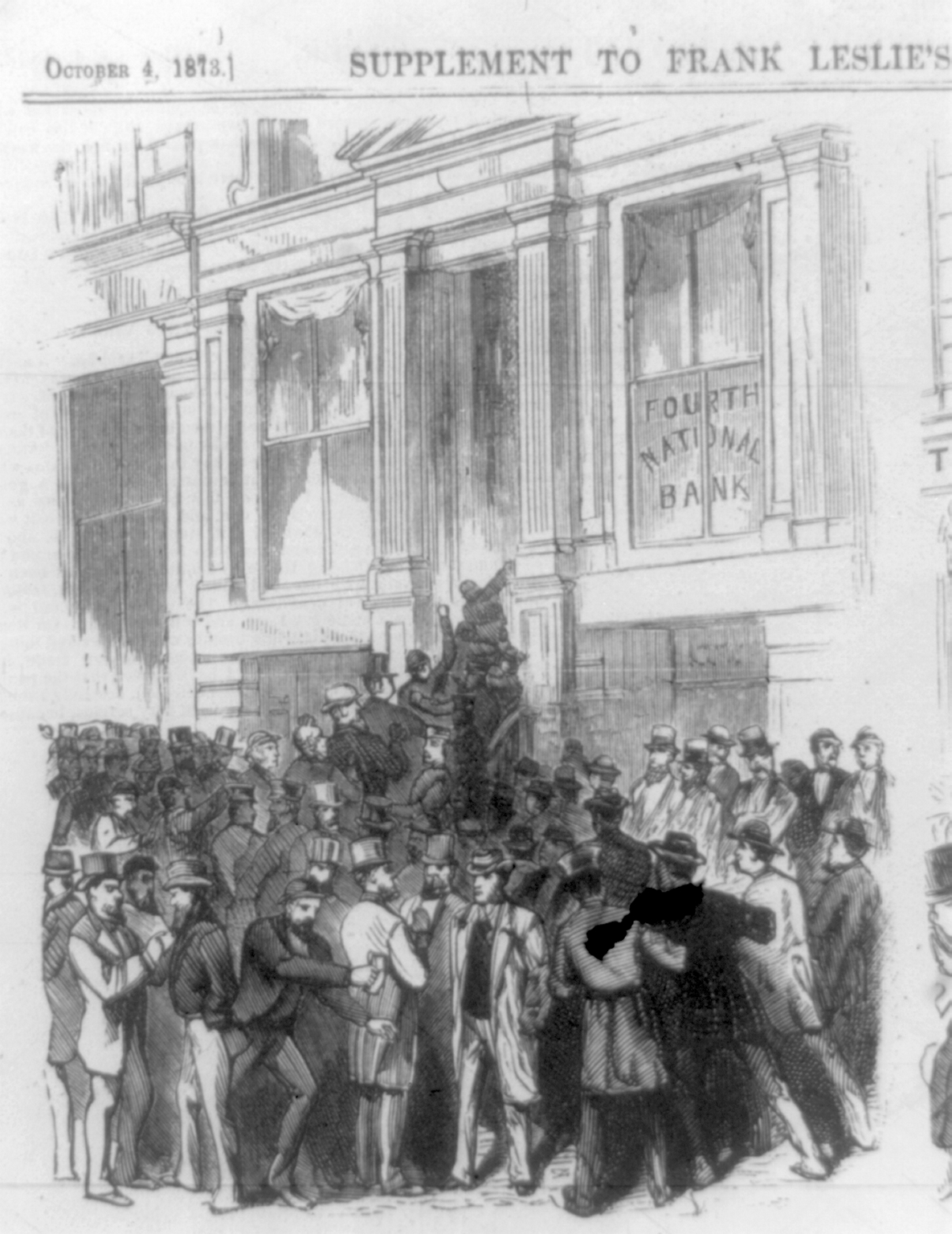
Run on the Fourth National Bank, No. 20 Nassau Street, New York City, 1873. From Frank Leslie's Illustrated Newspaper, October 4, 1873.

In 1873, during a decline in the value of silver – exacerbated by the end of the German Empire's production of thaler coins – the US government passed the Coinage Act of 1873 in April. This essentially ended the bimetallic standard of the United States, forcing it for the first time onto a pure gold standard. This measure, referred to by its opponents as "the Crime of 1873" and the topic of William Jennings Bryan's Cross of Gold speech in 1896, forced a contraction of the money supply in the United States. It also drove down silver prices further, even as new silver mines were being established in Nevada, which stimulated mining investment but increased supply as demand was falling. Silver miners arrived at US mints, unaware of the ban on production of silver coins, only to find their product no longer welcome. By September, the US economy was in a crisis, deflation causing banking panics and destabilizing business investment, climaxing in the Panic of 1873.

The Panic of 1873 has been described as "the first truly international crisis". The optimism that had been driving booming stock prices in central Europe had reached a fever pitch, and fears of a bubble culminated in a panic in Vienna beginning in April 1873. The collapse of the Vienna Stock Exchange began on May 8, 1873, and continued until May 10, when the exchange was closed; when it was reopened three days later, the panic seemed to have faded, and appeared confined to Austria-Hungary. Financial panic arrived in the Americas only months later on Black Thursday, September 18, 1873, after the failure of the banking house of Jay Cooke and Company over the Northern Pacific Railway. The Northern Pacific railway had been given 40 million acres (160,000 km^{2}) of public land in the Western United States and Cooke sought $100,000,000 in capital for the company; the bank failed when the bond issue proved unsalable, and was shortly followed by several other major banks. The New York Stock Exchange closed for ten days on September 20.

The financial contagion then returned to Europe, provoking a second panic in Vienna and further failures in continental Europe before receding. France, which had been experiencing deflation in the years preceding the crash, was spared financial calamity for the moment, as was the United Kingdom. Some argued the depression was rooted in the 1870 Franco-Prussian War that devastated the French economy and, under the Treaty of Frankfurt, forced that country to make large war reparations payments to Germany. The primary cause of the price depression in the United States was the tight monetary policy that the United States followed to get back to the gold standard after the Civil War. The U.S. government was taking money out of circulation to achieve this goal, therefore there was less available money to facilitate trade. Because of this monetary policy the price of silver started to fall causing considerable losses of asset values; by most accounts, after 1879 production was growing, thus further putting downward pressure on prices due to increased industrial productivity, trade and competition.

In the US, the speculative nature of financing due to both the greenback, which was paper currency issued to pay for the Civil War and rampant fraud in the building of the Union Pacific Railway up to 1869 culminated in the Crédit Mobilier scandal. Railway overbuilding and weak markets collapsed the bubble in 1873. Both the Union Pacific and the Northern Pacific lines were central to the collapse. (Another railway bubble was the Railway Mania in the United Kingdom thirty years earlier). Because of the Panic of 1873, governments depegged their currencies, to save money. The demonetization of silver by European and North American governments in the early 1870s was certainly a contributing factor. The US Coinage Act of 1873 was met with great opposition by farmers and miners, as silver was seen as more of a monetary benefit to rural areas than to banks in big cities. In addition, there were US citizens who advocated the continuance of government-issued fiat money (United States Notes) to avoid deflation and promote exports. The western US states were outraged – Nevada, Colorado, and Idaho were huge silver producers with productive mines, and for a few years mining abated. Resumption of silver dollar coinage was authorized by the Bland–Allison Act of 1878. The resumption of the US government buying silver was enacted in 1890 with the Sherman Silver Purchase Act.

Monetarists believe that the 1873 depression was caused by shortages of gold that undermined the gold standard, and that the 1848 California Gold Rush, 1886 Witwatersrand Gold Rush in South Africa and the 1896–99 Klondike Gold Rush helped alleviate such crises. Other analyses have pointed to developmental surges (see Kondratiev wave), theorizing that the Second Industrial Revolution was causing large shifts in the economies of many states, imposing transition costs, which may also have played a role in causing the depression.

== Course of the depression ==
Many countries experienced significantly lower growth rates relative to what they had experienced earlier in the 19th century and to what they experienced afterwards. Like the later Great Depression, the Long Depression affected different countries at different times, at different rates, and some countries accomplished rapid growth over certain periods. Globally, however, the 1870s, 1880s, and 1890s were a period of falling price levels and rates of economic growth significantly below the periods preceding and following. Between 1870 and 1890, iron production in the five largest producing countries more than doubled, from 11 million tons to 23 million tons, steel production increased twentyfold (half a million tons to 11 million tons), and railroad development boomed. At the same time, prices in several markets collapsed – the price of grain in 1894 was only a third what it had been in 1867, and the price of cotton fell by nearly 50 percent in just the five years from 1872 to 1877, imposing great hardship on farmers and planters. This collapse provoked protectionism in many countries, such as France, Germany, and the United States, while triggering mass emigration from other countries such as Italy, Spain, Austria-Hungary, and Russia. Similarly, while the production of iron doubled between the 1870s and 1890s, the price of iron halved.

Growth rates of industrial production (1850s–1913)
	1850s–1873	1873–1890	1890–1913
Germany	4.3	2.9	4.1
United Kingdom	3.0	1.7	2.0
United States	6.2	4.7	5.3
France	1.7	1.3	2.5
Italy		0.9	3.0
Sweden		3.1	3.5

GNP of the Great Powers of Europe (in billions USD, 1960 prices)
	1830	1840	1850	1860	1870	1880	1890
Russia	10.5	11.2	12.7	14.4	22.9	23.2	21.1
France	8.5	10.3	11.8	13.3	16.8	17.3	19.7
United Kingdom	8.2	10.4	12.5	16.0	19.6	23.5	29.4
Germany	7.2	8.3	10.3	12.7	16.6	19.9	26.4
Austria-Hungary	7.2	8.3	9.1	9.9	11.3	12.2	15.3
Italy	5.5	5.9	6.6	7.4	8.2	8.7	9.4

=== Austria-Hungary ===
The global economic crisis first erupted in Austria-Hungary, where in May 1873 the Vienna Stock Exchange crashed. In Hungary, the panic of 1873 terminated a mania of railroad-building.

=== Chile ===
In the late 1870s the economic situation in Chile deteriorated. Chilean wheat exports were outcompeted by production in Canada, Russia and Argentina and Chilean copper was largely replaced in international markets by copper from the United States and Spain. Income from silver mining in Chile also dropped. Aníbal Pinto, president of Chile in 1878, expressed his concerns the following way:

If a new mining discovery or some novelty of that sort does not come to improve the actual situation, the crisis that has long been felt, will worsen

— Aníbal Pinto, president of Chile, 1878.

This "mining discovery" came, according to historians Gabriel Salazar and Julio Pinto, into existence through the conquest of Bolivian and Peruvian lands in the War of the Pacific. It has been argued that economic situation and the view of new wealth in the nitrate was the true reason for the Chilean elite to go into war with its neighbors. Another response to the economic crisis, according to Jorge Pinto Rodríguez, was the new pulse of conquest of indigenous lands that took place in Araucanía in the 1880s.

=== France ===
France's experience was somewhat unusual. Having been defeated in the Franco-Prussian War, the country was required to pay £200 million in reparations to the Germans and was already reeling when the 1873 crash occurred. The French adopted a policy of deliberate deflation while paying off the reparations. The Paris Bourse crash of 1882 sent France into depression, one which "lasted longer and probably cost France more than any other in the 19th century". The Union Générale, a French bank, failed in 1882, prompting the French to withdraw three million pounds from the Bank of England and triggering a collapse in French stock prices.

The financial crisis was compounded by diseases impacting the wine and silk industries French capital accumulation and foreign investment plummeted to the lowest levels experienced by France in the latter half of the 19th century. Although a slight upturn took place in the late 1880s, the stagnation of the domestic industry wrought by the crash cast a pall over the financial sector that lasted until 1897-1899. French finances were further sunk by failing investments abroad, principally in railroads and buildings. The French net national product declined over the ten years from 1882 to 1892.

=== Italy ===
A ten-year tariff war broke out between France and Italy after 1887, damaging Franco-Italian relations which had prospered during Italian unification. As France was Italy's biggest investor, the liquidation of French assets in the country was especially damaging.

=== Russia ===
The Russian experience was similar to the experience in the United States – three separate recessions, concentrated in manufacturing, occurred in the period (1874–1877, 1881–1886, and 1891–1892), separated by periods of recovery.

=== United Kingdom ===
The United Kingdom, which had previously experienced crises every decade since the 1820s, was initially less affected by this financial crisis, even though the Bank of England kept interest rates as high as 9 percent in the 1870s. The 1878 failure of the City of Glasgow Bank in Scotland arose through a combination of fraud and speculative investments in Australian and New Zealand companies (agriculture and mining) and in American railroads. Building on an 1870 reform, and the 1879 famine, thousands of Irish tenant farmers affected by depressed producer prices and high rents launched the Land War in 1879, which resulted in the reforming Irish Land Acts.

=== United States ===
U.S. GDP per capita in 2011 dollars, 1865-1900, with NBER recessions indicated

Estimated declines in United States manufacturing output in selected sectors (1872–1876)
Industry	% decline in output
Durable goods	30%
Iron and steel	45%
Construction	30%
Overall	10%

In the United States, the Long Depression began with the Panic of 1873. The National Bureau of Economic Research dates the contraction following the panic as lasting from October 1873 to March 1879. At 65 months, it is the longest-lasting contraction identified by the NBER, eclipsing the Great Depression's 43 months of contraction. Figures from Milton Friedman and Anna Schwartz show net national product increased 3 percent per year from 1869 to 1879 and real national product grew at 6.8 percent per year during that time frame. However, since between 1869 and 1879 the population of the United States increased by over 17.5 percent, per capita NNP growth was lower. Angus Maddison's estimates of GDP per capita show decline followed by no growth during the 1873-79 recession, but very rapid growth after, in 1879-82. Following the end of the episode in 1879, the U.S. economy would remain unstable, experiencing recessions for 114 of the 253 months until January 1901.

The dramatic shift in prices mauled nominal wages – in the United States, nominal wages declined by one-quarter during the 1870s, and as much as one-half in some places, such as Pennsylvania. Although real wages had enjoyed robust growth in the aftermath of the American Civil War, increasing by nearly a quarter between 1865 and 1873, they stagnated until the 1880s, posting no real growth, before resuming their robust rate of expansion in the later 1880s. The collapse of cotton prices devastated the already war-ravaged economy of the southern United States. Although farm prices fell dramatically, American agriculture continued to expand production.

Thousands of American businesses failed, defaulting on more than a billion dollars of debt. One in four laborers in New York were out of work in the winter of 1873–1874, and nationally a million became unemployed. The sectors which experienced the most severe declines in output were manufacturing, construction, and railroads. The railroads had been a tremendous engine of growth in the years before the crisis, yielding a 50% increase in railroad mileage from 1867 to 1873. After absorbing as much as 20% of US capital investment in the years preceding the crash, this expansion came to a dramatic end in 1873; between 1873 and 1878, the total amount of railroad mileage in the United States barely increased at all.

The Freedman's Savings Bank was a typical casualty of the financial crisis. Chartered in 1865 in the aftermath of the American Civil War, the bank had been established to advance the economic welfare of America's newly emancipated freedmen. In the early 1870s, the bank had joined in the speculative fever, investing in real estate and unsecured loans to railroads; its collapse in 1874 was a severe blow to African Americans. The recession exacted a harsh political toll on President Ulysses S. Grant. Historian Allan Nevins says of the end of Grant's presidency:

Various administrations have closed in gloom and weakness ... but no other has closed in such paralysis and discredit as (in all domestic fields) did Grant's. The President was without policies or popular support. He was compelled to remake his Cabinet under a grueling fire from reformers and investigators; half its members were utterly inexperienced, several others discredited, one was even disgraced. The personnel of the departments was largely demoralized. The party that autumn appealed for votes on the implicit ground that the next Administration would be totally unlike the one in office. In its centennial year, a year of deepest economic depression, the nation drifted almost rudderless.

Recovery began in 1878. The mileage of railroad track laid down increased from 2,665 mi (4,289 km) in 1878 to 11,568 in 1882. Construction began recovery by 1879; the value of building permits increased two and a half times between 1878 and 1883, and unemployment fell to 2.5% in spite of (or perhaps facilitated by) high immigration. Business profits declined between 1882 and 1885, with a rapid contraction beginning in 1884. Business activity fell by nearly a fourth during the Depression of 1882–1885 and nearly 10,000 businesses failed in both 1884 and 1885. The recovery in railroad construction reversed itself, falling from 11,569 mi (18,619 km) of track laid in 1882 to 2,866 mi (4,612 km) of track laid in 1885; the price of steel rails collapsed from $71/ton in 1880 to $20/ton in 1884. Manufacturing again collapsed – durable goods output fell by a quarter again. The decline became a financial crisis in 1884, when multiple New York banks collapsed; simultaneously, in 1883–1884, tens of millions of dollars of foreign-owned American securities were sold out of fears that the United States was preparing to abandon the gold standard. This financial panic closed eleven New York banks, more than a hundred small state banks, and led to defaults on at least $32 million worth of debt. Unemployment, which had stood at 2.5% between recessions, surged to 7.5% in 1884–1885, and 13% in the northeastern United States, even as immigration plunged in response to deteriorating labor markets.

The 1880s saw an extraordinarily large expansion of industry, of railroads, of physical output, of net national product, and real per capita income. As Friedman and Schwartz admit, the decade from 1869 to 1879 saw a 3-percent-per annum increase in money national product, an outstanding real national product growth of 6.8 percent per year in this period, and a phenomenal rise of 4.5 percent per year in real product per capita. Even the alleged "monetary contraction" never took place, the money supply increasing by 2.7 percent per year in this period. From 1873 through 1878, before another spurt of monetary expansion, the total supply of bank money rose from $1.964 billion to $2.221 billion – a rise of 13.1 percent or 2.6 percent per year. In short, a modest but definite rise, and scarcely a contraction.

== Reactions to the crisis ==
=== Protectionism ===
The period preceding the Long Depression had been one of increasing economic internationalism, championed by efforts such as the Latin Monetary Union, many of which then were derailed or stunted by the impacts of economic uncertainty. The extraordinary collapse of farm prices provoked a protectionist response in many nations. Rejecting the free trade policies of the Second Empire, French president Adolphe Thiers led the new Third Republic to protectionism, which led ultimately to the stringent Méline tariff in 1892. Germany's agrarian Junker aristocracy, under attack by cheap, imported grain, successfully agitated for a protective tariff in 1879 in Otto von Bismarck's Germany over the protests of his National Liberal Party allies. In 1887, Italy and France embarked on a bitter tariff war. In the United States, Benjamin Harrison won the 1888 US presidential election on a protectionist pledge. As a result of the protectionist policies enacted by the world's major trading nations, the global merchant marine fleet posted no significant growth from 1870 to 1890 before it nearly doubled in tonnage in the prewar economic boom that followed. Only the United Kingdom and the Netherlands remained committed to low tariffs.

=== Monetary responses ===
In 1874, a year after the 1873 crash, the United States Congress passed legislation called the Inflation Bill of 1874 designed to confront the issue of falling prices by injecting fresh greenbacks into the money supply. Under pressure from business interests, President Ulysses S. Grant vetoed the measure. In 1878, Congress overrode President Rutherford B. Hayes's veto to pass the Silver Purchase Act, a similar but more successful attempt to promote "easy money".

=== Strikes ===
The United States endured its first nationwide strike in 1877, the Great Railroad Strike of 1877. This led to widespread unrest and often violence in many major cities and industrial hubs including Baltimore, Philadelphia, Pittsburgh, Reading, Saint Louis, Scranton, and Shamokin.

=== New Imperialism ===
The Long Depression arguably contributed to the revival of colonialism leading to the New Imperialism period, symbolized by the scramble for Africa, as the western powers sought new markets for their surplus accumulated capital. According to Hannah Arendt's The Origins of Totalitarianism (1951), the "unlimited expansion of power" followed the "unlimited expansion of capital". In the United States, beginning in 1878, the rebuilding, extending, and refinancing of the western railways, commensurate with the wholesale giveaway of water, timber, fish, minerals in what had previously been Indian territory, characterized a rising market. This led to the expansion of markets and industry, together with the robber barons of railroad owners, which culminated in the genteel 1880s and 1890s. The Gilded Age was the outcome for the few rich. The cycle repeated itself with the Panic of 1893, another huge market crash.

== Recovery ==
In the United States, the National Bureau of Economic Analysis dates the recession through March 1879. In January 1879, the United States returned to the gold standard which it had abandoned during the Civil War; according to economist Rendigs Fels, the gold standard put a floor to the deflation, and this was further boosted by especially good agricultural production in 1879. The view that a single recession lasted from 1873 to 1896 or 1897 is not supported by most modern reviews of the period, although separate major recessions are documented to have occurred in the 1870s and 1880s.

== Explanations ==
Irving Fisher believed that the Panic of 1873 and the severity of the contractions which followed it could be explained by debt and deflation and that a financial panic would trigger catastrophic deleveraging in an attempt to sell assets and increase capital reserves; that selloff would trigger a collapse in asset prices and deflation, which would in turn prompt financial institutions to sell off more assets, only to further deflation and strain capital ratios. Fisher believed that had governments or private enterprise embarked on efforts to reflate financial markets, the crisis would have been less severe.

David Ames Wells (1891) wrote of the technological advancements during the period 1870–1890, which included the Long Depression. Wells gives an account of the changes in the world economy transitioning into the Second Industrial Revolution in which he documents changes in trade, such as triple expansion steam shipping, railroads, the effect of the international telegraph network and the opening of the Suez Canal. Wells gives numerous examples of productivity increases in various industries and discusses the problems of excess capacity and market saturation. Wells' opening sentence read:

The economic changes that have occurred during the last quarter of a century – or during the present generation of living men – have unquestionably been more important and more varied than during any period of the world's history.

Other changes Wells mentions are reductions in warehousing and inventories, elimination of middlemen, economies of scale, the decline of craftsmen, and the displacement of agricultural workers. About the whole 1870–90 period Wells said:

Some of these changes have been destructive, and all of them have inevitably occasioned, and for a long time yet will continue to occasion, great disturbances in old methods, and entail losses of capital and changes in occupation on the part of individuals. And yet the world wonders, and commissions of great states inquire, without coming to definite conclusions, why trade and industry in recent years has been universally and abnormally disturbed and depressed.

Wells notes that many of the government inquiries on the "depression of prices" (deflation) found various reasons such as the scarcity of gold and silver. Wells showed that the US money supply actually grew over the period of the deflation. Wells noted that deflation lowered the cost of only goods that benefited from improved methods of manufacturing and transportation. Goods produced by craftsmen and many services did not decrease in value, and the cost of labor actually increased. Also, deflation did not occur in countries that did not have modern manufacturing, transportation, and communications.

Nobel laureate economist Milton Friedman, author of A Monetary History of the United States, on the other hand, blamed this prolonged economic crisis on the imposition of a new gold standard, part of which he referred to by its traditional name, The Crime of 1873. Additionally, Friedman pointed to the expansion of the gold supply through Gold cyanidation as a contributor to the recovery. This forced shift into a currency whose supply was limited by nature, unable to expand with demand, caused a series of economic and monetary contractions that plagued the entire period of the Long Depression. Murray Rothbard, in his book History of Money and Banking of the United States, argues that the long depression was only a misunderstood recession since real wages and production were actually increasing throughout the period. Like Friedman, he attributes falling prices to the resumption of a deflationary gold standard in the U.S. after the Civil War.

== Interpretations ==
Most economic historians see this period as negative for the most industrial nations. Many argue that most of the stagnation was caused by a monetary contraction caused by abandonment of the bimetallic standard, in favor of a new fiat gold standard, starting with the Coinage Act of 1873. Other economic historians have complained about the characterization of this period as a "depression" because of conflicting economic statistics that cast doubt on this interpretation. They note it saw a relatively large expansion of industry, of railroads, of physical output, of net national product, and of real per capita income.

As economists Milton Friedman and Anna J. Schwartz have noted, the decade from 1869 to 1879 saw a growth of 3 percent per year in money national product, an outstanding real national product growth of 6.8 percent per year, and a rise of 4.5 percent per year in real product per capita. Even the alleged "monetary contraction" never took place, the money supply increasing by 2.7 percent per year. From 1873 through 1878, before another spurt of monetary expansion, the total supply of bank money rose from $1.964 billion to $2.221 billion, a rise of 13.1 percent, or 2.6 percent per year. In short, it was a modest but definite rise, not a contraction. Although per-capita nominal income declined very gradually from 1873 to 1879, that decline was more than offset by a gradual increase over the course of the next 17 years.

Furthermore, real per capita income either stayed approximately constant (1873–1880; 1883–1885) or rose (1881–1882; 1886–1896), so the average consumer appears to have been considerably better off at the end of the "depression" than before. Studies of other countries where prices also tumbled, including the United States, Germany, France, and Italy, reported more markedly positive trends in both nominal and real per capita income figures. Profits generally were also not adversely affected by deflation, although they declined (particularly in the UK) in industries struggling against superior, foreign competition. Furthermore, some economists argue a falling general price level is not inherently harmful to an economy and cite the economic growth of the period as evidence. As economist Murray Rothbard has stated:

Unfortunately, most historians and economists are conditioned to believe that steadily and sharply falling prices must result in depression: hence their amazement at the obvious prosperity and economic growth during this era. For they have overlooked the fact that in the natural course of events, when government and the banking system do not increase the money supply very rapidly, freemarket capitalism will result in an increase of production and economic growth so great as to swamp the increase of money supply. Prices will fall, and the consequences will be not depression or stagnation, but prosperity (since costs are falling, too), economic growth, and the spread of the increased living standard to all the consumers.

Accompanying the overall growth in real prosperity was a marked shift in consumption from necessities to luxuries: by 1885, "more houses were being built, twice as much tea was being consumed, and even the working classes were eating imported meat, oranges, and dairy produce in quantities unprecedented". The change in working class incomes and tastes was symbolized by "the spectacular development of the department store and the chain store".

Prices certainly fell, but almost every other index of economic activity – output of coal and pig iron, tonnage of ships built, consumption of raw wool and cotton, import and export figures, shipping entries and clearances, railway freight clearances, joint-stock company formations, trading profits, consumption per head of wheat, meat, tea, beer, and tobacco – all of these showed an upward trend.

A large part at least of the deflation commencing in the 1870s was a reflection of unprecedented advances in factory productivity. Real unit production costs for most final goods dropped steadily throughout the 19th century and especially from 1873 to 1896. At no previous time had there been an equivalent "harvest of technological advances... so general in their application and so radical in their implications". That is why, notwithstanding the dire predictions of many eminent economists, the UK did not end up paralyzed by strikes and lockouts. Falling prices did not mean falling money wages. Instead of inspiring large numbers of workers to go on strike, falling prices were inspiring them to go shopping.

== See also ==
- Crisis theory
- Economic history
- Equine Influenza of 1872
- Gilded Age
- Great Depression of British Agriculture (1873–1896)
- Kondratiev wave
- List of economic crises
- List of recessions in the United States
- New Imperialism
- Panic of 1873
- Panic of 1893
- Second Industrial Revolution
