= Post–World War I recession =

Global economic downturn (1918–1921)

The post–World War I recession was an economic recession that hit much of the world in the aftermath of World War I. In many nations, especially in North America, economic growth continued and even accelerated during World War I as nations mobilized their economies to fight the war in Europe. After the war ended, the global economy began to decline. In the United States, 1918–1919 saw a modest economic retreat, but the second part of 1919 saw a mild recovery. A more severe recession hit the United States in 1920 and 1921, when the global economy fell very sharply.

== North America ==
In North America, the recession immediately following World War I was extremely brief, lasting for only seven months from August 1918 (even before the war had actually ended) to March 1919. A second, much more severe recession, sometimes labeled a depression, began in January 1920. Several indices of economic activity suggest the recession was moderately severe. The Axe-Houghton Index of Trade and Industrial Activity declined by 14.1% in this recession (compared to a 31% decline in the Panic of 1907). The Babson index of physical volume of business activity declined by 28.6% in the immediate postwar recession (compared to a 32.3% decline in the 1921 recession and a 22.7% decline in the Panic of 1907).

== Germany ==
In Germany, the economic recession and inflation was harder due to the imposition of the Treaty of Versailles. A period of hyperinflation severely devalued the Mark and nearly crippled the German economy.

== United Kingdom ==
Britain initially enjoyed an economic boom between 1919–1920, as private capital pent-up over 5 years of war was invested into the economy. The shipbuilding industry was flooded with orders to replace lost shipping (7.9 million tons worth of merchant shipping stock was destroyed during the war). However, by 1921, the British transition from a wartime to a peacetime economy faltered, and a serious recession struck the economy between 1921–1922. With other major economies also mired in recession, the export-dependent economy of Britain was particularly hard-hit. Unemployment reached 17%, with overall exports at only half of their pre-war levels.

== Global pandemic of 1918 ==
The 1918 Spanish flu pandemic had an adverse economic impact. Many businesses were shuttered during the worst of the outbreak and the sheer numbers killed reduced the workforce population significantly. Work by economists Robert Barro and Jose Ursua suggests that the flu was responsible for declines in gross domestic product of 6 to 8 percent worldwide between 1919 and 1921.

== See also ==
- Hyperinflation in the Weimar Republic
- Aftermath of World War I
- Dawes Plan
- Great Depression
