= Victor Zarnowitz =

American economist

Victor Zarnowitz (born 1919 in Łańcut Poland, d. 21 February 2009 in New York City) was a leading scholar on business cycles, indicators, and forecast evaluation. Zarnowitz was Senior Fellow and Economic Counselor to The Conference Board. He was professor emeritus of Economics and Finance, Graduate School of Business, The University of Chicago, and Research Associate, National Bureau of Economic Research (NBER).

== Background ==
In 1939, he fled Poland to escape the Nazi invasion, but was imprisoned by the Soviet Russians and worked at a labor camp in Siberia. Zarnowitz earned his Ph.D. in economics (summa cum laude) at the University of Heidelberg in Germany in 1951. He came to the United States in 1952. In 1959 he moved to Chicago and became a professor at the University of Chicago.

He was a Fellow of the National Association of Business Economists, Fellow of the American Statistical Association, Honorary Fellow of the International Institute of Forecasters, and Honorary Member of the Center for International Research on Economic Tendency Surveys (CIRET). In 2001, he received the William F. Butler Memorial Award from the New York Association for Business Economists. His numerous papers and books include An Appraisal of Short-Term Economic Forecasts (1967), The Business Cycle Today (1972), Orders, Production, and Investment (1973), and Business Cycles: Theory, History, Indicators, and Forecasting (1992). His most recent papers are "Has the Business Cycle Been Abolished?" (1998), "Theory and History Behind Business Cycles" (1999), and "The Old and the New in U.S. Economic Expansion" (2000).

He was notable as a researcher on the performance of economic forecasting, and he concluded that economic forecasters have little success in predicting business cycle turning points. He established that planners are better off using the average of forecasts, rather than relying on any individual forecast. This has become a common practice on the part of governments in the setting of their budgets.

Zarnowitz remained an active economist throughout his life. In 1999 he joined The Conference Board, the organization which publishes the Index of Leading Indicators and the Consumer Confidence Index. He continued working five-day weeks until the day before he died, according to The Conference Board, and he was also an active member of the Business Cycle Dating Committee at the National Bureau of Economic Research. His final decision with the committee was the determination that the Late-2000s recession had begun in December 2007. In 2008, Zarnowitz published a book about his experiences with Nazis and Russians, "Fleeing the Nazis, Surviving the Gulag, and Arriving in the Free World: My Life and Times," which received wide praise.

The historical pattern in which deep recessions are usually followed by steep recoveries is known by economists as "the Zarnowitz rule".

== Publications ==
- Zarnowitz, Victor (1985), 'Recent work on business cycles in historical perspective: a review of theories and evidence'. Journal of Economic Literature 23 (2), pp. 523–80.
- Zarnowitz, Victor (1992), Business cycles: theory, history, indicators and forecasting. The university of Chicago press. In Studies in business cycles. vol 27. ISBN 0-226-97890-7
- Zarnowitz, Victor (2008), 'Fleeing the Nazis, Surviving the Gulag, and Arriving in the Free World: My Life and Times,' Praeger, ISBN 978-0-313-35778-7
