= Recession of 1969–1970 =

Economic downturn in the United States

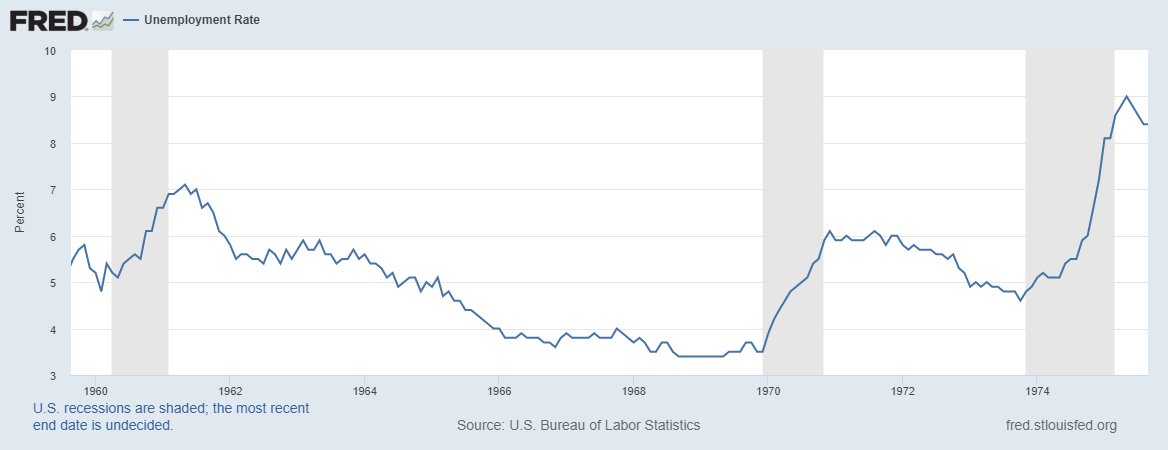
US unemployment rate, 1960–1975. The period of this recession is represented by the second shaded section.

The recession of 1969–1970 was a relatively mild recession in the United States. According to the National Bureau of Economic Research, the recession lasted for 11 months, beginning in December 1969 and ending in November 1970. It followed an economic slump that began in 1968.

At the end of the expansion, inflation was rising, possibly a result of increased deficit spending during a period of full employment. This recession coincided with an attempt to start closing the budget deficits of the Vietnam War (fiscal tightening) and the Federal Reserve raising interest rates (monetary tightening).

During this relatively mild recession, the gross domestic product of the United States fell 0.6 percentage points. Though the recession ended in November 1970, the unemployment rate did not peak until the next month. In December 1970, the rate reached its height for the cycle of 6.1 percent.
