= Recession of 1960–1961 =

Economic downturn in the United States

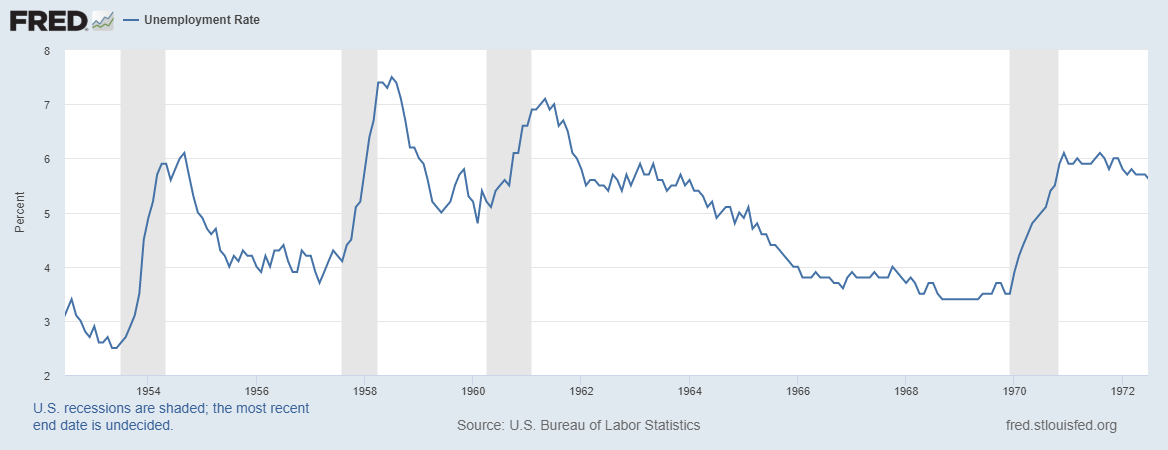
US unemployment rate, 1952–1972

The recession of 1960–1961 was a recession in the United States. According to the National Bureau of Economic Research, the recession lasted for 10 months, beginning in April 1960 and ending in February 1961. The recession preceded the third-longest economic expansion in U.S. history, from February 1961 until the beginning of the recession of 1969–1970 in December 1968.

The Federal Reserve had started to tighten monetary policy in 1958 and eased off in 1961.

During this recession, the GDP of the United States fell 1.4 percentage points. Though the recession ended in February 1961, the unemployment rate did not peak for several more months. In May 1961, the rate reached its height for the cycle of 7.1 percent.

== See also ==
- List of recessions in the United States
