= Recession of 1949 =

Economic downturn in the United States

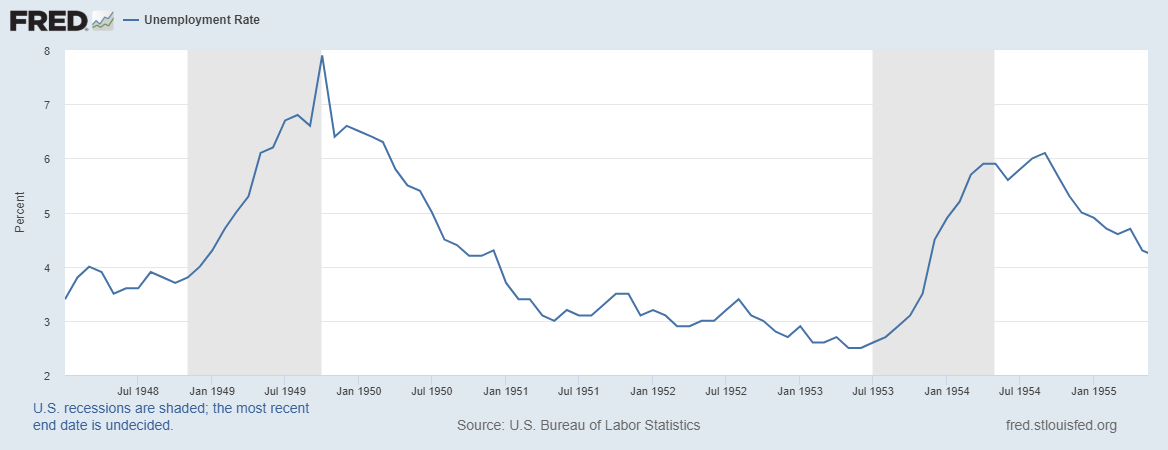
US unemployment rate, 1948–1955

The recession of 1949 was a downturn in the United States lasting for 11 months. According to the National Bureau of Economic Research, the recession began in November 1948 and lasted until October 1949.

The 1949 recession was a brief economic downturn; forecasters of the time expected much worse, perhaps influenced by the poor economy in their recent lifetime. The recession began shortly after President Truman's "Fair Deal" economic reforms. Many regard the aftermath of the end of World War II to be the main cause of the recession. According to C. A. Blyth, "the most important cause of 1948–1949 recession was substantial fall in the fixed investments". The recession also followed a period of monetary tightening by the Federal Reserve.

During this recession, the gross domestic product of the United States fell 1.7%. In October 1949, the unemployment rate peaked at 7.9%. Department store sales fell 22%. The wholesale price and cost of living indexes fell 12 and 5 points respectively.
