= Fuel crisis =

Fuel crisis may refer to:

- 1947 fuel crisis, in the United Kingdom
- 1973 oil crisis
- 1979 oil crisis
- 2012 United Kingdom fuel crisis
- 2012 fuel crisis in the Gaza Strip
- 2015 Nepal fuel crisis
- 2021 United Kingdom fuel supply crisis
- 2021 United Kingdom natural gas supplier crisis
- 2025–2026 Russian fuel crisis
- 2026 Iran war fuel crisis

== See also ==
- Energy crisis
