= List of oil crises =

List of major oil crises

The term oil crisis (or oil shock) refers to periods of sudden disruption in oil supply or sharp increases in oil prices that significantly affect the global economy.

These events are typically caused by geopolitical conflicts, coordinated production cuts (notably by OPEC), or large-scale imbalances between global supply and demand. Oil crises have often resulted in inflationary pressure, economic recessions, and long-term changes in global energy policy.

== List of oil crises ==
- 1973 oil crisis
- 1979 energy crisis
- 1990 oil price shock
- 2000s energy crisis
- 2008 oil price spike
- 2014–2016 oil glut
- 2020 oil price crash
- 2020s energy crisis
- 2026 Strait of Hormuz crisis

== See also ==
- Energy crisis
- Oil price history
