= Oil crisis =

Oil crisis or oil shock may refer to:

- Abadan Crisis ("Iran Oil Crisis") of 1951–1954, nationalization, coup, and de-nationalisation in Iran
- 1970s energy crises
  - 1973 oil crisis, the first worldwide oil crisis, in which prices increased 400%
  - 1979 oil crisis, in which prices increased 100%
- 1990 oil price shock (the "mini oil-shock"), in which prices increased for nine months
- 2000s energy crisis
- 2020 Russia–Saudi Arabia oil price war, in which prices declined more than 50%
- 2022–2023 Russia–European Union gas dispute, in which EU member states sought to rapidly exclude natural gas imports from Russia following Russia's invasion of Ukraine
- 2026 Strait of Hormuz crisis, where Iran's closure of the important shipping lane has led to prices increasing by nearly 100% by April 30
- Peak oil, a hypothetical time in the future when oil production enters permanent decline

== See also ==
- Energy crisis
