= History of trade unions in the United Kingdom =

The History of trade unions in the United Kingdom covers British trade union organisation, activity, ideas, politics, and impact, from the early 19th century to the recent past. For current status see Trade unions in the United Kingdom.

== 18th–19th centuries ==
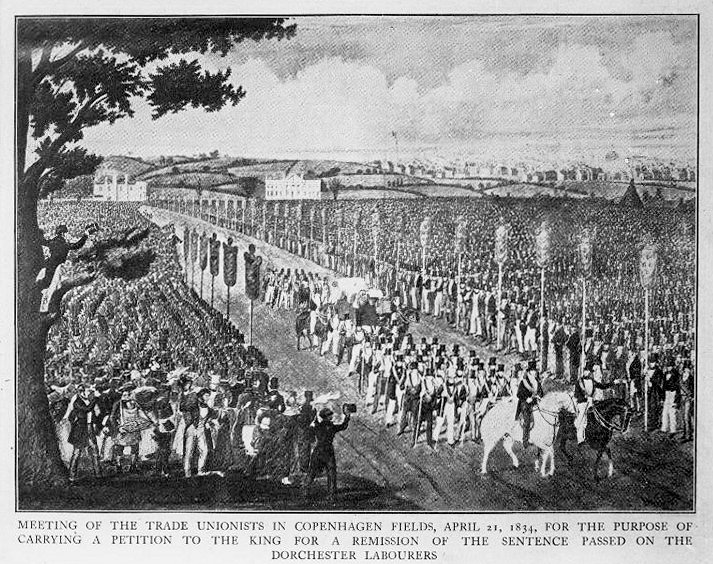
Meeting of the trade unionists in Copenhagen Fields, 21 April 1834, for the purpose of carrying a petition to the King for a remission of the sentence passed on the Dorchester labourers

Unions in Britain were subject to often severe repression until 1824, but were already widespread in cities such as London. Trade unions were legalised in 1824, when growing numbers of factory workers joined these associations in their efforts to achieve better wages and working conditions. Workplace militancy had also manifested itself as Luddism and had been prominent in struggles such as the 1820 Rising in Scotland, in which 60,000 workers went on a general strike, which was soon crushed. From 1830 on, attempts were made to set up national general unions, most notably Robert Owen's Grand National Consolidated Trades Union in 1834, which attracted a range of socialist from Owenites to revolutionaries. That organisation played a part in the protests after the Tolpuddle Martyrs' case, but soon collapsed.

An important development of the trade union movement in Wales was the Merthyr Rising in May 1831 where coal and steel workers employed by the powerful Crawshay family took to the streets of Merthyr Tydfil, calling for reform, protesting against the lowering of their wages and general unemployment. Gradually the protest spread to nearby industrial towns and villages and by the end of May the whole area was in rebellion, and for the first time in the world the red flag of revolution was flown – which has since been adopted internationally by the trades union movement and socialist groups generally.

=== Chartism ===
In the later 1830s and 1840s, trade unionism was overshadowed by political activity. Of particular importance was Chartism, the aims of which were supported by most socialists, although none appear to have played leading roles. Chartism was a working-class movement for political reform in Britain which emerged in 1836 and was most active between 1838 and 1848. It took its name from the People's Charter of 1838 and was a national protest movement, with particular strongholds of support in Northern England, the East Midlands, the Staffordshire Potteries, the Black Country, and the South Wales Valleys. Support for the movement was at its highest in 1839, 1842, and 1848, when petitions signed by millions of working people were presented to Parliament. The petitions were rejected each time.

The strategy employed was to use the scale of support which these petitions and the accompanying mass meetings demonstrated to put pressure on politicians to concede manhood suffrage. Chartism thus relied on constitutional methods to secure its aims, though there were some who became involved in insurrectionary activities, notably in the Newport Rising in November 1839. The government did not yield to any of the demands, and suffrage had to wait another two decades. Chartism was popular among some trade unions, especially London's tailors, shoemakers, carpenters, and masons. One reason was the fear of the influx of unskilled labour, especially in tailoring and shoe making. In Manchester and Glasgow, engineers were deeply involved in Chartist activities. Many trade unions were active in the general strike of 1842, which spread to 15 counties in England and Wales, and eight in Scotland. Chartism taught techniques and political skills that inspired trade union leadership.

=== New establishments ===
Union activity from the 1850s to the 1950s in textiles and engineering was largely in the hands of the skilled workers. They supported differentials in pay and status as opposed to the unskilled. They focused on control over machine production and were aided by competition among firms in the local labour market.

After the Chartist movement of 1848 fragmented, efforts were made to form a labour coalition. The Miners' and Seamen's United Association in the North-East, operated 1851–1854 before it too collapsed because of outside hostility and internal disputes over goals. The leaders sought working-class solidarity as a long-term aim, thus anticipating the affiliative strategies promoted by the Labour Parliament of 1854.

More permanent trade unions were established from the 1850s, better resourced but often less radical. The London Trades Council was founded in 1860, and the Sheffield Outrages spurred the establishment of the Trades Union Congress in 1868, with the first meeting taking place at the Mechanics' Institute, Manchester. The legal status of trade unions in the United Kingdom was established by a Royal Commission on Trade Unions in 1867, which agreed that the establishment of the organisations was to the advantage of both employers and employees. Unions were legalised in 1871 with the adoption of the Trade Union Act 1871.

=== New Unionism: 1889–93 ===
The "aristocracy of labour" comprise the skilled workers who were proud and jealous of their monopolies, and set up labour unions to keep out the unskilled and semiskilled. The strongest unions of the mid-Victorian period were unions of skilled workers such as the Amalgamated Society of Engineers. Trade unionism was quite uncommon amongst semi-skilled and unskilled workers. The union officials avoided militancy, fearing that strikes would threaten the finances of unions and thereby their salaries. An unexpected strike wave broke out in 1889–90, largely instigated by the rank and file. Its success can be explained by the dwindling supply of rural labour, which in turn increased the bargaining power of unskilled workers. The New Unionism starting in 1889 was a systematic outreach to bring in as union members the striking unskilled and semiskilled workers. Ben Tillett was a prominent leader of the London Dock strike of 1889. He formed the Dock, Wharf, Riverside and General Labourers' Union in 1889, which had support from skilled workers. Its 30,000 members won an advance in wages and working conditions.

Unions played a prominent role in the creation of the Labour Representation Committee which effectively formed the basis for today's Labour Party.

=== Women ===
Women were largely excluded from trade union formation, membership, and hierarchies until the late 19th century. When women did attempt to challenge male hegemony and make inroads into the representation of labour and combination, it was largely due to the tenacity of middle-class reformers such as the Women's Protective and Provident League (WPPL) which sought to amiably discuss conditions with employers in the 1870s. It became the Women's Trade Union League. Militant Socialists broke away from the WPPL and formed the Women's Trade Union Association, but they had little impact. There were a few cases in the 19th century where women trade union members took initiative. In the 1875 West Yorkshire weavers' strike, women did play a central role, and the 1888 London matchgirls strike (and subsequent formation of the Union of Women Matchmakers) was influential for the 1889 London Dock strike and the development of the New Unionism.

=== Emerging Labour Party ===
The Labour Party's origins lie in the late 19th century, when it became apparent that there was a need for a new political party to represent the interests and needs of the urban proletariat, a demographic which had increased in number and had recently been enfranchised. Some members of the trades union movement became interested in moving into the political field, and after further extensions of the voting franchise in 1867 and 1885, the Liberal Party endorsed some trade-union sponsored candidates. The first Lib–Lab candidate to stand was George Odger in the Southwark by-election of 1870. In addition, several small socialist groups had formed around this time, with the intention of linking the movement to political policies. Among these were the Independent Labour Party, the intellectual and largely middle-class Fabian Society, the Marxist Social Democratic Federation and the Scottish Labour Party.

== Since 1900 ==
=== 1900–1945 ===
Politics became a central issue for the coal miners, whose organisation was facilitated by their location in remote one-industry villages. The Miners' Federation of Great Britain formed in 1888, and counted 600,000 members in 1908. Much of the 'old left' of Labour politics can trace its origins to coal-mining areas.

==== Upheavals: 1910–1914 ====
The working classes were beginning to protest politically for a greater voice in government, especially after 1908, reaching a crescendo known as the Great Unrest in 1910-1914. The extreme agitation included the 1910-1911 Tonypandy riots; the 1911 Liverpool general transport strike; the National coal strike of 1912; and the 1913 Dublin lockout. It was modern Britain's worst labour unrest and compares with the 1926 general strike. The period of unrest was labelled "great" not because of its scale, but due to the level of violence employed by both the state and labourers; including deaths of strikers at the hands of police and sabotage on the part of the workers.

The Great Unrest saw an enormous increase in trade union membership, from 2.5 to 4 million between 1911 and 1914. The militants were most active in coal mining, textiles and transportation. Much of the militancy emerged from grassroots protests against falling real wages, with union leadership scrambling to catch up. The new unions of semiskilled workers were the most militant. The National Sailors' and Firemen's Union directed strike activities in many port cities across Britain. The national leadership was strongly supported by local leaders, for example the Glasgow Trades Council. In Glasgow and other major cities there were distinctive local variations. Glasgow was more unified and coherent than most centres. The long-term result was seen in the strength of waterfront organisation on the Clyde River, marked as it was by the emergence of independent locally based unions among both dockers and seamen.

==== First World War ====
Industrial production of munitions was a central feature of the war, and with a third of the men in the labour force moved into the military, demand was very high for industrial labour. Large numbers of women were employed temporarily. Trade unions gave strong support to the war effort, cutting back on strikes and restrictive practices. Membership doubled from 4.1 million in 1914, to 8.3 million in 1920. The Trades Union Congress (TUC) accounted for 65% of union members in 1914, rising to 77% in 1920. Labour's prestige had never been higher, and it systematically placed its leaders into Parliament.

The Munitions of War Act 1915 followed the Shell Crisis of 1915 when supplies of material to the front became a political issue. The Act forbade strikes and lock-outs and replaced them with compulsory arbitration. It set up a system of controlling war industries, and established munitions tribunals that were special courts to enforce good working practices. It suspended, for the duration, restrictive practices by trade unions. It tried to control labour mobility between jobs. The courts ruled the definition of munitions was broad enough to include textile workers and dock workers. The 1915 act was repealed in 1919, but similar legislation took effect during the Second World War.

In Glasgow, the heavy demand for munitions and warships strengthened union power. There emerged a radical movement called "Red Clydeside" led by militant trades unionists. Formerly a Liberal Party stronghold, the industrial districts switched to Labour by 1922, with a base among the Irish Catholic working class districts. Women were especially active solidarity on housing issues. However, the "Reds" operated within the Labour Party and had little influence in Parliament; the mood changed to passive despair by the late 1920s.

The war saw in a further increase in union membership, as well as widespread recognition of unions and their increased involvement in management. Strikes were not patriotic, and the government tried to hold wages down. At war's end unions became quite militant in attempting to hold their gains; they were usually defeated. Membership grew from 4.1 million in 1914 to 6.5 million in 1918, peaking at 8.3 million in 1920 before relapsing to 5.4 million in 1923.

==== 1920s ====
The immediate postwar era saw a series of radical events, stimulated in part by the Russian Revolution of 1917. The trade unions, especially in Scotland, were militant. However the government compromised, and as the economy stabilised in the early 1920s the labour unions moved sharply to the right. An exception came with the coal miners' union, which faced lower wages in a declining industry hurt by lower prices, severe competition from oil, and sharply declining productivity in Britain's ageing coal mines. Both in 1920 and in 1921, there were more labour disputes than at any time in the inter-war period, except in 1926.

The 1926 general strike was declared by the Trades Union Congress for the benefit of the coal miners, but it failed. It was a nine-day nationwide walkout of one million railwaymen, transport workers, printers, dockers, ironworkers and steelworkers supporting the 1.5 million coal miners who had been locked out. Ultimately many miners returned to work, and were forced to accept longer hours and lower pay.

Additionally, in 1927 the government passed sweeping anti-union legislation under the Trade Disputes and Trade Union Act 1927. This imposed major curbs on union power, including outlawing sympathetic strikes and mass picketing, and ensuring that civil service unions were banned from affiliating with the TUC. The 1926 general strike was considered a grave mistake by TUC leaders such as Ernest Bevin. Most historians treat it as a singular event with few long-term consequences, but Martin Pugh says it accelerated the movement of working-class voters to the Labour Party, which led to future gains. The 1927 Act made general strikes illegal and ended the automatic payment of union members to the Labour Party. That act was repealed by the Trade Disputes and Trade Unions Act 1946.

==== Foreign policy and the 1930s ====
The foreign policy of the trade unions was generally anti-Communist. Support for the Republican cause in the Spanish Civil War, 1936–39 was widespread on the left, attendees included conservatives and liberals as well. However, the Labour Party leadership deeply distrusted the communist element and rejected proposed unity campaigns.

The British Trades Union Congress (TUC) split on support for non-intervention in the Spanish Civil War, but the leaders Walter Citrine and Ernest Bevin used their block votes to pass motions supporting non-intervention at the TUC Congress in September 1936, making non-intervention a TUC policy. Like the Labour Party (which had also formerly supported non-intervention), between October 1936 and June 1937 and under pressure from the LSI and the International Federation of Trade Unions, Citrine, Bevin and the TUC repudiated non-intervention.

The TUC, working in collaboration with the American Federation of Labor blocked a 1937 proposal to allow Soviet trade union membership in the International Federation of Trade Unions (IFTU). The TUC reversed its policy in 1938 to allow the Russians in, but one backed opposition in 1939 when Stalin and Hitler came to terms. When Britain entered the war, the TUC was a strong supporter, and it sent leaders to the United States to win American labour support. When Hitler invaded Russia in 1941, TUC sent leaders to Moscow as well, realising that Britain needed a military alliance against Hitler. Meanwhile, the AFL fought against any recognition of Soviet organisations, and fought its own battle with the Congress of Industrial Organizations. As a result of these manipulations, the foreign policy voice of organised labour in both Britain and the United States was seriously weakened. It played little role in the formation of the United Nations as the war ended. After the war, the British unions resumed a staunchly anti-communist and anti-Soviet position. Communists did however occupy local positions of power especially in the coal miners' union.

While involvement in foreign policy went poorly, British trade unions grew dramatically in membership and power during the Second World War.

=== Trade unions ===
Unions became well represented in the war cabinet after Winston Churchill came to power in May 1940. He appointed Ernest Bevin, the general secretary of the Transport and General Workers' Union, as the Minister of Labour and National Service Furthermore other Labour Party leaders shared power equally with Conservatives in the new national government. Churchill named Labour Party leader Clement Attlee as his chief deputy with primary responsibility for home affairs. Trade unions gave strong cooperation to the war effort and at first strikes were minimized. Union membership grew by a third from 1938, reaching 8.2 million in 1943. According to historian Margaret Gowing, the mobilization of Britain's workforce to meet enormous wartime demands in munitions production came in three distinct phases. In the initial phase leading up to May 1940, efforts to mobilize manpower were largely ineffective and fell short of meeting the nation's escalating labour demands. The second phase (spring 1940 - mid-1943) witnessed a remarkably efficient organization and deployment of both men and women into essential roles across key industries and vital government services. This period marked the pinnacle of Britain's manpower mobilization capabilities.

With victory in sight, from mid-1943 onward, Britain's capacity to sustain its war effort became increasingly constrained by the shortage of additional manpower reserves to draw upon. Strike activity now became a major concern. Although illegal, there were 1,800 strikes in 1943, costing 1.8 million working days. Coal strikes accounted for much of the inaction. With millions of men in uniform, Britain had reached the limits of its available civilian workforce. Overall, the government grappled with the immense challenge of effectively marshaling its human resources to meet the unprecedented labour requirements imposed by a total war.

The British unions made urgent appeals for military help to American unions in 1939-1941. There was friction in coordinating foreign policies when the U.S. entered the war. This was especially tense regarding support for the Soviet war effort. Unions in the UK and US were sidelined and played no major role in the creation of the United Nations in 1945.

=== Since 1945 ===
The unexpected landslide of the Labour Party in 1945 gave it a strong voice in national affairs, especially with Ernest Bevin as Foreign Minister.

Trade unions reached their peak of membership, visibility, prestige and political power in the postwar era. A broad "post-war consensus" accepted their status, and they were heavily represented in the leadership of the Labour Party. By the 1970s their power had grown further, but their prestige was in decline and the consensus disappeared. In the 1980s the Conservative Party led by Margaret Thatcher deliberately and significantly weakened the trade union movement. It has never recovered.

The strong anti-communist policy persisted in the postwar era. The unions gave strong support to British participation in the Cold War and NATO, as well as international bodies such as the international Confederation of Free Trade Unions that excluded communist unions of the sort that joined the Soviet-dominated World Federation of Trade Unions. In some unions, especially the National Union of Mineworkers (NUM), the Communists did have some power, as typified by Mick McGahey, vice-president from 1972 to 1987, and Arthur Scargill, the president from 1982 to 2002. More effective in the Communist cause was Ken Gill, president of a large union and in 1974 the first Communist elected in decades to the TUC General Council. He focused on racial issues. British unions collaborated with the AFL-CIO in the United States on international projects. In the 1980s, worldwide union attention focused on the Solidarity union movement in Poland, which finally succeeded in breaking the communist control of that country. Norman Willis, the general secretary of the TUC, vigorously promoted union support for Solidarity. The nuclear disarmament movement, which played a major role in Labour Party internal politics in the 1980s, was primarily a middle-class movement that had little support in the labour movement.

==== 1978–79 ====
Major strike action by British unions during the 1978–1979 Winter of Discontent contributed to the downfall of the Labour government of James Callaghan. Callaghan, himself a trade-unionist, had previously appealed for unions to exercise pay restraint, as part of the British Government's policies at the time to try to curb rampant inflation. His attempt to try to limit unions to a 5% pay rise led to widespread official and unofficial strikes across the country during the winter of that year. Official and unofficial strike action by lorry drivers, rail workers, nurses and ambulance drivers precipitated a feeling of crisis in the country. The effects of the union action caused a major swing in voting intention. In November 1978, a Gallup poll suggested a 5% Labour lead in the opinion polls. Following the union action that Winter, in February 1979, the Conservatives had a 20% lead.

==== Thatcher and 1980s ====
Callaghan's government fell and Margaret Thatcher's Conservatives swept to victory in the subsequent general election and introduced new union laws in part to combat the industrial unrest that had plagued the previous Wilson and Callaghan governments. The unions in turn were her bitter enemies. Thatcher saw strong trade unions as an obstacle to economic growth and in the Employment Act 1980 and Employment Act 1982 passed restrictive legislation of the sort the Tories had long avoided.

In his memoirs, the Secretary of State for Employment at the time, Norman Tebbit, said of the 1982 Act: "I have no doubt that Act was my greatest achievement in Government and I believe it has been one of the principal pillars on which the Thatcher economic reforms have been built."

The National Union of Mineworkers (NUM) had long been one of the strongest labour unions. Its strikes had toppled the Heath government in the 1970s. However, the miners were not successful in their 1984-1985 strike. A strike was called by the Yorkshire region of the NUM in protest against proposed pit closures, invoking a regional ballot result from 1981. The National Executive Committee, led by Arthur Scargill, chose not to hold a national ballot on a national strike, as was conventional, but to declare the strike to be a matter for each region of the NUM to enforce. Scargill defied public opinion, a trait Prime Minister Thatcher exploited when she used the Ridley Plan, drafted in 1977, to defeat the strike. Subsequently, over several decades, almost all the mines were shut down.

More than 6,000 printing workers went on strike in 1986 in the Wapping dispute, for what they and their union saw as "unacceptable" terms of employment for jobs at The Sun newspaper's new HQ in Wapping. They too lost.

=== New Labour and the 21st century ===
==== New Labour ====
Although the Labour Party won the 1997 general election, Tony Blair's New Labour was much less influenced by the unions than former Labour governments had been and Blair himself "[did] not bother to disguise his disdain for British trade unionism". Blair's government also refused to repeal many of Thatcher's anti-union laws, despite the trade unions having provided most of the funding for his election campaign. This shift in Labour Party policy and rhetoric has been linked to a broader decline of traditional class-focused rhetoric by trade unions in Britain.

==== 2010s ====
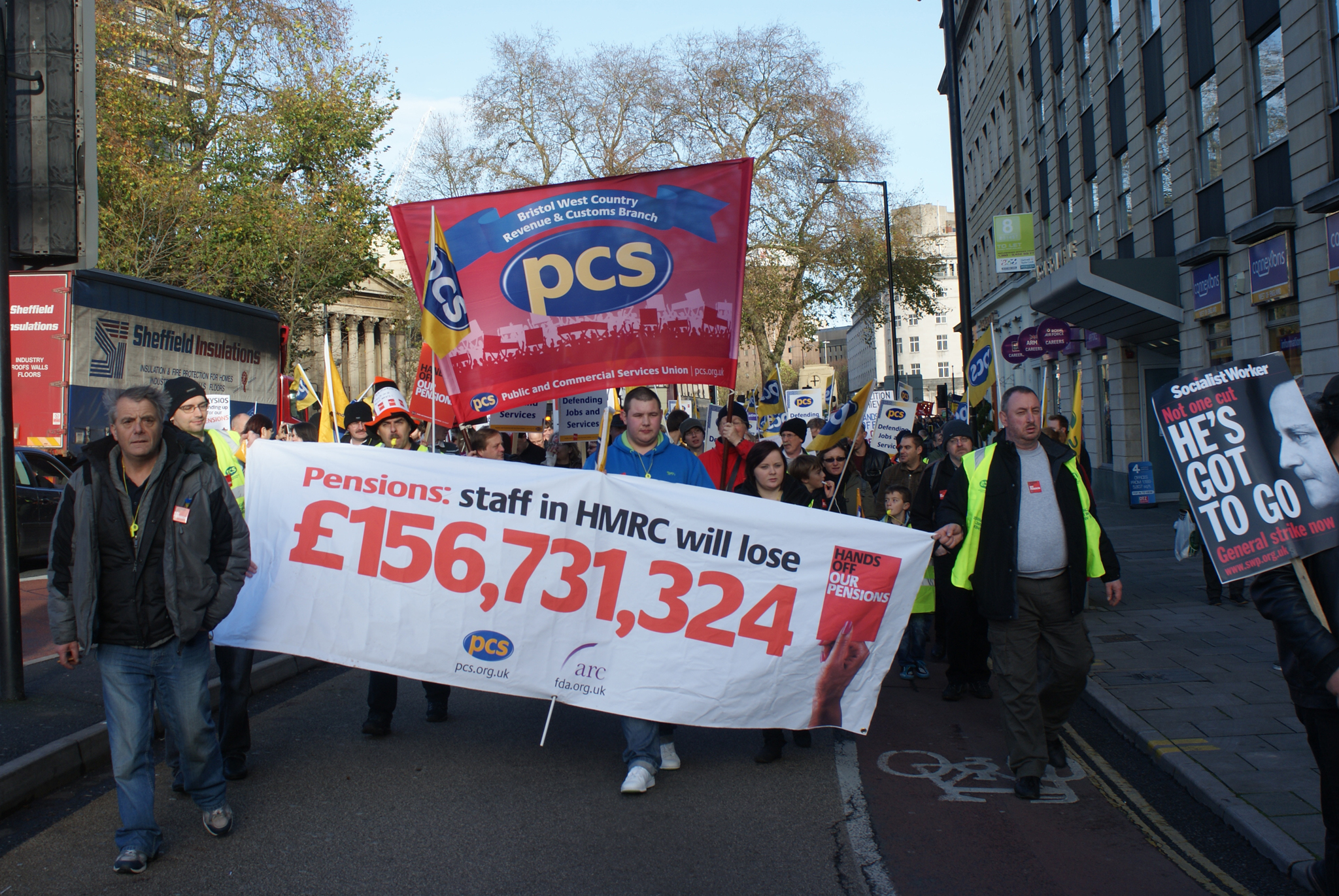
Protesters in Bristol during the 2011 public sector strikes

In the 2010 Labour leadership election, trade unions were instrumental in Ed Miliband's victory over his brother when he won the support of three of Britain's four biggest unions. This led to Miliband being regularly depicted as in the debt of the unions, earning the nickname 'Red Ed'.

In 2011, up to two million public sector workers went on a 24-hour strike over pension cuts. 76 percent of state-funded schools were affected, with 62 percent of school being forced to close entirely. The UK government had to recruit civil servants from other departments and fly embassy staff home to prevent long delays at borders and airports after 80 to 90 percent of staff in the Immigration Service Union went on strike. 79,000 NHS staff (about 14.5 percent of the workforce) also went on strike. According to the Office for National Statistics, 1.39 million working days were lost due to the strike.

=== Membership decline ===
Membership declined steeply in the 1980s and 1990s, falling from 13 million in 1979 to around 7.3 million in 2000. In 2012, union membership dropped below 6 million for the first time since the 1940s. From 1980 to 1998, the proportion of employees who were union members fell from 52% to 30%. In 2021, it was reported that trade union membership had more than halved since 1979, when 53 percent of workers were union members.

== Academic journals ==
- The Labor History journal, a scholarly publication published by Taylor & Francis
- Labour History, a scholarly journal published in Australia by the Australian Society for the Study of Labour History (ASSLH)
- The Labour History Review, a scholarly journal published in the UK by the Society for the Study of Labour History

== See also ==
- Conspiracy, and Protection of Property Act 1875
- Criminal Law Amendment Act 1871
- Employers and Workmen Act 1875
- History of the Labour Party (UK)
- Socialism in the United Kingdom
- Labour Party (UK)
- Labor history, deals with the scholarly historiography
- The Australian labour movement, including its history

Unions

- List of trade unions in the United Kingdom
- Trade unions in the United Kingdom
- Amalgamated Society of Boilermakers, Shipwrights, Blacksmiths and Structural Workers (ASBSBSW)
- Amalgamated Textile Warehousemen's Association 1894–1986
- Amalgamated Textile Workers' Union, 1974–1985
- Association of Professional, Executive, Clerical and Computer Staff (APEX)
- Coopers' Federation of Great Britain (CFGB)
- Furniture, Timber and Allied Trades Union (FTAT)
- GMB, 1889–present; formerly named "General, Municipal, Boilermakers and Allied Trade Union"
- Municipal Employees' Association to 1924
- National Amalgamated Union of Labour (NAUL) to 1924
- National Federation of Women Workers (NFWW) 1906–1921
- National Union of General and Municipal Workers (GMWU) 1924–present
- National Union of Mineworkers
- National Union of Railwaymen
- National Union of Tailors and Garment Workers (NUTGW)
- United Rubber Workers of Great Britain
- Trades Union Congress
- United Textile Factory Workers' Association, 1886 and 1974.
