= 2021 United Kingdom fuel crisis =

2021 United Kingdom fuel crisis may refer to:

- 2021 United Kingdom natural gas supplier crisis
- 2021 United Kingdom fuel supply crisis
