= Economic recovery =

Phase of the business cycle following a recession

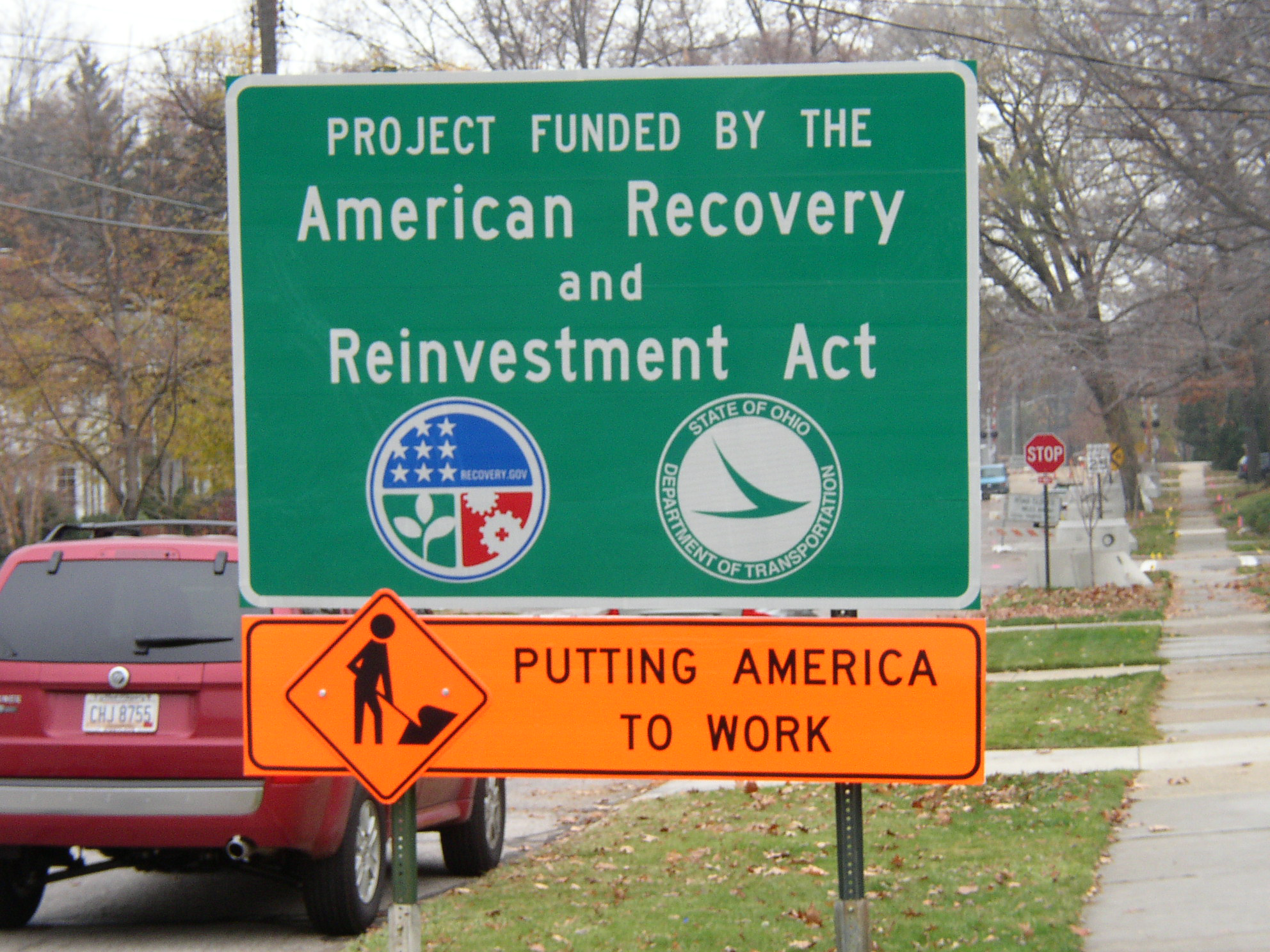
A "Project funded by The American Recovery and Reinvestment Act" project sign

An economic recovery is the phase of the business cycle following a recession. The overall business outlook for an industry looks optimistic during the economic recovery phase.

During the recovery period, the economy goes through a process of economic adaptation and change to new circumstances, including the reasons that caused the recession in the first place, as well as the new policies and regulations enacted by governments and central banks in reaction to the recession.

When displaced workers find new employment and failing enterprises are bought up or broken up by others, the labor, capital goods, and other economic resources that were tied up in businesses that failed and went under after the recession are re-employed in new industries. Recovery is the process by which the economy heals itself from the harm it has sustained, paving the way for future growth.

"Terms such as 'recovery', 'reconstruction', and 'rebuilding' might suggest a return to the status quo before the conflict. Typically, however, developmental pathologies such as extreme inequality, poverty, corruption, exclusion, institutional decay, poor policy design and economic mismanagement will have contributed to armed conflicts in the first instance and will have been further exacerbated during conflict. Accordingly, post-conflict recovery is often not about restoring pre-war economic or institutional arrangements; rather, it is about creating a new political economy dispensation. It is not about simply building back, but about building back differently and better. As such, economic recovery . . . is essentially transformative, requiring a mix of far-reaching economic, institutional, legal and policy reforms that allow war-torn countries to re-establish the foundations for self-sustaining development."

== Indicators ==
Leading indicators include the stock index, which often increases ahead of an economic recovery. This is generally because stock markets are guided by potential hopes.

Other important indicators are unemployment rate and employment-population ratio (EPR). In the recovery phase we can talk about total recovery after the unemployment rate reaches its prerecession norm, because at this state the economy reached its prereccesion optimal level of unemployment. The norm for unemployment is in most of countries considered to be between 4-6 %.

On the other hand, both unemployment rate and EPR are usually a lagging measure. Since many employers will not recruit additional workers until they are sufficiently sure that there is a long-term demand for new hiring, unemployment frequently stays strong even though the economy starts to recover and it is equalized by the end of recovery phase.

GDP is typically used to predict economic phases, with two-quarters of successive negative GDP growth signaling a contraction. There is also a perception, that the Economic recovery phase ends, when the country's GDP reaches its prerecession level, so the economy will reach the level of GDP equal to the latest peak, and at this point starts an economic expansion. There is also a difference in the definition of previous peak. There we can measure either Real GDP, or potential real GDP, which is the highest level that can be sustained over a prolonged period without causing excessive inflation. (As the Congressional Budget Office explains - CBO. )

Consumer morale and inflation are two other economic factors to remember.

== Keynesian vs Classical Theory ==
Keynes dismissed the classical view that the economy must naturally return to equilibrium. Instead, he concluded that if an economic slowdown occurs, for whatever reason, the panic and gloom that it generates among firms and consumers seem to become self-fulfilling, leading to a prolonged period of low economic growth and unemployment. In reaction, Keynes proposed a countercyclical monetary strategy in which, during times of economic adversity, the government could engage in deficit spending to compensate for a fall in consumption and increase consumer spending in order to sustain aggregate demand.

According to Keynes, depression can trigger a vicious loop in which unemployment lowers demand to the point that no new jobs can be generated. By stimulating demand, government action builds a positive cycle.

=== The Keynesian approach in points ===
- Provide a strong monetary and fiscal stimulus – public spending is needed when private sector demand is small.
- Pay special attention to labor-intensive development programs that have the capacity for a large fiscal multiplier impact.
- Bailout the private sector to save massive employment cuts.

== History ==
=== Great Depression ===
Given the importance of monetary deflation and the gold standard in triggering the Great Depression, it is not shocking that currency depreciation and monetary growth were the primary causes of global recovery. However, devaluation did not explicitly increase productivity. Rather, it helped countries to increase their money supply without having to worry about gold flows or exchange rates. Countries that took advantage of this freedom recovered faster. The United States' monetary growth, which began in early 1933, was especially dramatic. Between 1933 and 1937, the American money supply rose by almost 42 percent.

This monetary expansion was largely the result of a massive gold inflow to the United States, which was prompted in part by increasing political tensions in Europe prior to World War II. By cutting interest rates and making credit more readily accessible, monetary inflation increased spending. It also provided inflationary rather than deflationary expectations, allowing prospective creditors more hope that their incomes and earnings would be able to fund their debt payments if they were to borrow. Fiscal policies played a minor role in promoting recovery in the United States.

Franklin D. Roosevelt's New Deal, which began in early 1933, included a host of new federal measures aimed at spurring recovery. It remains to be seen if they have any positive impact on customer and company opinion. Any New Deal projects may have hampered rehabilitation. The United States' recovery was cut short by another distinct contraction that began in May 1937 and lasted until June 1938.

=== 2008 financial crisis ===
The United States responded to the 2008 financial crisis by cutting interest rates close to zero, buying mortgage loans and government debt, and bailouts of several distressed financial institutions. With interest rates too low, bond returns have become much less appealing to buyers as compared to listed shares. The government's reaction sparked the stock market, with the S&P 500 returning 250 percent over a ten-year stretch. The housing market in most big cities in the United States recovered, and the unemployment rate plummeted as firms started to recruit and spend more.

Other central banks reacted in a similar manner to the United States. All governments boosted their spending to spur demand and sustain jobs in the economy; pledged deposits and bank bonds to bolster interest in financial companies; and bought equity stakes in some banks and other financial institutions to avoid bankruptcies, which might have escalated the financial market crisis.

Despite the fact that the world economy suffered the most severe recession since the Great Depression, policy responses avoided a global depression.

As a result of the recession, authorities tightened their supervision of banks and other financial institutions. Among the several recent global rules, banks must now analyze the value of the loans they provide more carefully and use more resilient financing sources.

The adoption of the Dodd-Frank Wall Street Regulation and Consumer Protection Act, a major piece of financial reform legislation enacted by the Obama administration in 2010, was one result of the crisis. Dodd-Frank altered every part of the United States financial regulatory system, affecting every regulatory agency and every financial service company.

=== Covid-19 Crisis 2020-2022 ===
The methods by which countries' governments promoted economic recovery can be generally divided into two groups; centralized and decentralized governments.

==== Centralised ====
Though The United States faced several economic challenges amid the ongoing global pandemic, 2021 was a successful year in the USA economy. The country likely reached the fastest economic growth since 1984, and has seen record jobs gains and a considerable drop in unemployment. All of this is due to the policies implemented during the pandemic.

At the beginning of the COVID-19 pandemic, the USA government decided to implement multiple aid programs, which are collectively known as 'Biden Boom'. Of which 2 major programs were the American Rescue Plan Act (ARPA) and the COVID-19 vaccine program. Much of this aid was disbursed to the families who were most negatively financially impacted by the pandemic. These policies addressed weaknesses in the social safety net that became more apparent during the pandemic. The U.S. economy gained an average of 565 000 jobs per month and 6.2 Million during 2021. As a result of high job gains the unemployment rate fell by 2.5% and reached 3.9% at the end of 2021. Because of low unemployment and a rise in income, The United States managed to surpass their pre-pandemic level of economic output. The U.S. was also the first country from G7 to recover all GDP lost during the pandemic. The economic growth was estimated to be 5.5 percent for year 2021.

Other countries implemented similar policies, but they were not as effective. Report produced by the UN Department of Economic and Social Affairs (DESA) in 2022 states, that there is still a large number of problems, namely new waves of COVID-19 infections, persistent labour market, lingering supply-chain challenges, and rising inflationary pressures, which slows global economic growth. The slowdown is expected to continue in upcoming years. After a boom driven by higher spendings made by government in 2021 and the economic growth of 5.5%, global output is assumed to grow by only 4.0% in 2022 and 3.5% in 2023.

Large centralized economies needed to be careful about their decisions, because they could overwhelm small and starting businesses with too much funding or regulations.

At the beginning of the pandemic, Japan's government expanded the stimulus programmes that were initially intended for small enterprises, to include financing for medium and large companies. The programme now involves government-backed lenders in Japan providing specific loans to all companies affected by pandemics. The loans are also better accessible by companies, because of lower interest rate (around 1% instead of usual 5%) and there is no need for loans to be coordinated with private lenders.

==== Decentralized ====
Decentralized and local governments chose a way of higher independence for states and municipalities. Businesses had a wide field to operate and maximize their profits under the premise that they would make more job opportunities and would bring more money into their local economies.

Aside from letting companies maximize their profits, these governments also had an option to free up and redistribute central government resources to local institutions. For instance, there was a local government approach to economic recovery in Mexico. The government supported local tourism, which was highly affected by pandemics. Although the Government implemented reduced capacity measures, and health and safety protocols, they did not mandate any protocol that would have made visitor entry difficult. For example, they decided to not require international travelers be vaccinated before their arrival in the country.

== See also ==
- Green recovery
- Great Depression
- Post-War
- 1990 Oil Price Shock
- 2008 financial crisis
