= 2008 Central Asia energy crisis =

Energy shortage in Central Asia

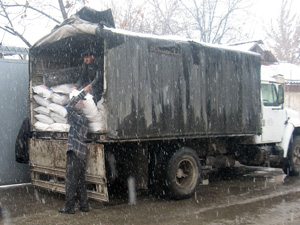
Supplies are unloaded from a truck in Tajikistan during the harsh 2007–2008 winter

The 2008 Central Asia energy crisis was an energy shortage in Central Asia, which, combined with the severe weather of the 2007-08 winter (the coldest since 1969) and high prices for food and fuel, caused considerable hardship for many. The abnormally cold weather pushed demand up for electricity, exacerbating the crisis. The situation was most dire in Tajikistan. An international appeal was made by the United Nations, NGOs, and the Red Cross and Red Crescent for around US$25 million to assist the government. At the time, The UN warned that millions face starvation during the 2008-09 winter.

== World Bank debt and price hikes ==
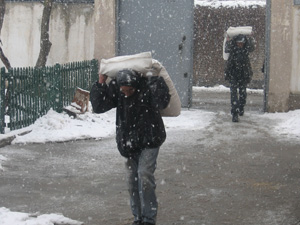
Aid supplies in Tajikistan

At the beginning of January 2008, officials announced an electricity price hike of 20 percent to allow the "government [to] repay its debt to the World Bank." According to an official at Barqi Tojik, a national power company, limits will become stricter, and the price for electricity is expected to rise until 2010.

In April 2008, Pradeep Mitra, World Bank chief economist for Europe and Central Asia, issued an uncharacteristic statement, urging the worse-hit countries to spend more on social assistance and "top up" their social programs.

Nonetheless, Mitra focus remained centred "on inflation management," suggesting that the affected countries "especially refrain from imposing controls on trade" (measures recently undertaken by many countries to protect their populations from food price inflation and keep food available domestically), arguing that "it could work against the food supply in the longer term."

== Power shortages ==
Starting on January 13, 2008, many villages received only one to three hours of electricity per day, and the capital Dushanbe cut power to residential areas overnight. On January 26, 2008, Dushanbe cut power to places of entertainment (including restaurants, shops, pharmacies, markets, and public bathhouses), causing many to close until spring. There were only few visible lights in the city which were from the owners of generators, factories, or people who had illegally tapped the power lines. The restriction was set to end February 10, however it was subsequently extended. There were only few exemptions to the restrictions which included government offices, hospitals, and certain industrial cities, such as Tursunzoda, which had a large aluminium plant. Because of inoperable central heating systems in Dushanbe and other cities, residents in apartment blocks had no means other than electricity to heat their homes.

== Harsh winter ==
The situation was exacerbated by the cold winter, with temperatures reaching -20 degrees Celsius. Dushanbe residents reported wearing several jackets and overcoats to sleep and all family members sleeping under a single blanket to share warmth. The UN's World Food Programme also declared the food situation as being in emergency shortage, in both cities and rural areas.

== Allegations of media suppression ==
As of mid-January 2008, the state-run media did not discuss the problem. Subsequently, throughout the month of February, there emerged numerous Western media reports of children dying in maternity wards of hospitals during blackouts. The Tajik government maintains that the blackouts were not responsible for any deaths. The Tajik government has appealed for international aid. Meanwhile, aid workers and diplomats urged the government to declare a state of emergency. The handling of the crisis has raised questions about the competence of the political leadership.

== Famine warning ==
On March 3, 2008, it was reported that the crisis in Tajikistan has eased: "From now on (at least till the next winter) Dushanbe is not going to have problems with electricity and the tough schedule introduced in the beginning of this winter was abandoned on March 1, 2008 in Dushanbe by the decision of Barqi Tojik." The Christian Science Monitor, neweurasia, and other media observers predicted that a nascent hunger crisis will erupt into a full famine as a consequence of the energy shortages, which subsequently happened. UN experts announced on 10 October that almost one-third of Tajikistan's 6.7 million inhabitants did not have enough to eat for the winter of 2008–09.

== Kyrgyzstan ==
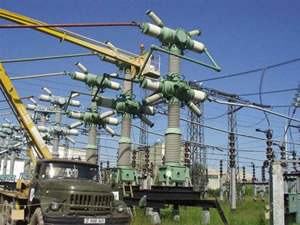
A power station in Kyrgyzstan

In Kyrgyzstan, also rich in hydroelectric resources, the cold weather had made demand 10% higher than in the winter of 2006/2007, which depleted the main Toktogul reservoir for hydroelectric power.

== Uzbekistan ==
Beginning in late December 2007, the unusually harsh weather had frozen the gas supply to numerous homes and businesses across Uzbekistan. As a result, there had been numerous demonstrations and protests against the government, in favor of an insured uninterrupted supply of gas and electricity. The government response was varied, and in Karakalpakstan, they met protesters and promised to rectify the situation, while the local government head of Hazarasp responded to a complaint by one woman by cutting off gas altogether to all the houses on her street.

Some in Uzbekistan were able to turn to "traditional methods" for heating, and it was reported that some villages which had no trees left because villagers have cut them down to heat their homes and cook food. This had an expected negative effect on the economy, because the leaves are essential to the local silk industry, and the fruit grown on these trees are the main source of income for many villagers.

== Turkmenistan ==
In some provinces of Turkmenistan, villagers were burning saxaul plants, a traditional Turkmen way to heat homes, since in the cities, the central heating pipes have been neglected and failed to produce adequate heat.

== Tajikistan ==
During the winter of 2007–2008, Tajikistan experienced its coldest weather since 1969, leading to a sharp increase in national electricity demand. The heightened demand for heating, occurring simultaneously with elevated regional food and fuel prices, contributed to the 2008 Central Asia energy crisis, causing severe power shortages and humanitarian impacts throughout the country.

== See also ==
- 2008 Bulgarian energy crisis
- Energy crisis
- 2000s commodities boom
- Global storm activity of 2008
- Global storm activity of 2007
