= Early 1990s recession in the United States =

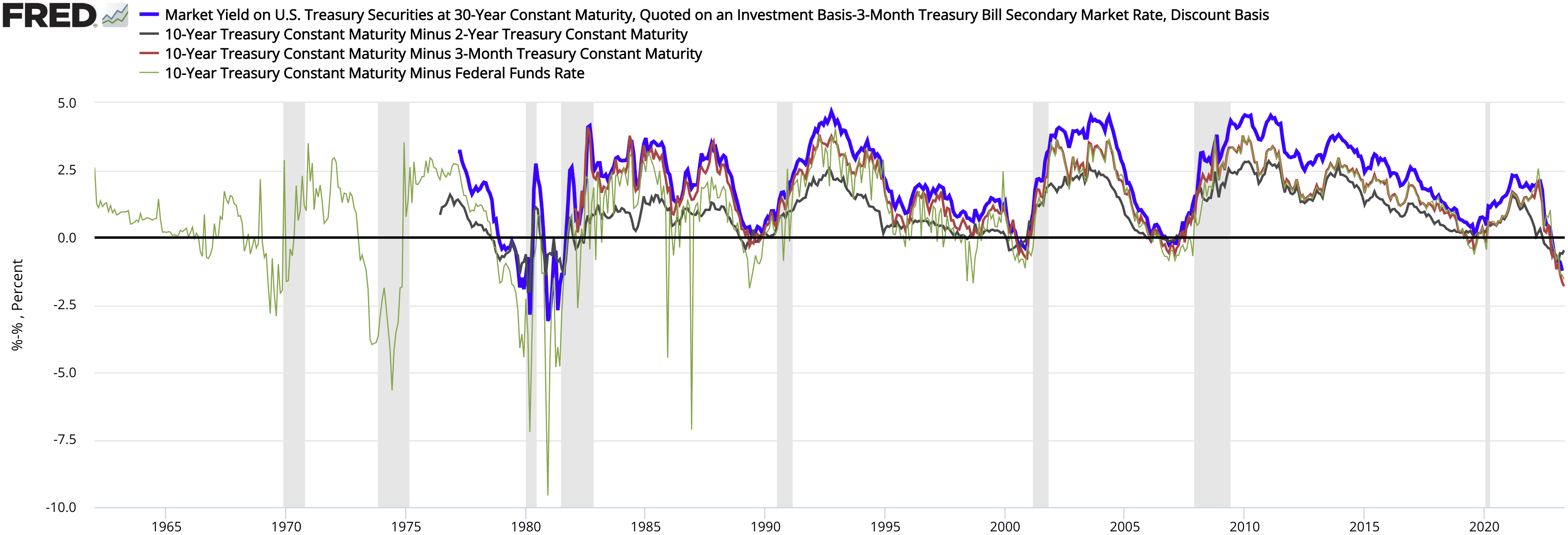
Treasury yield spreads Inverted yield curve in late 1989 and early 1990 30 year minus 3 month 10 year minus 2 year 10 year minus 3 month 10 year minus Federal funds rate

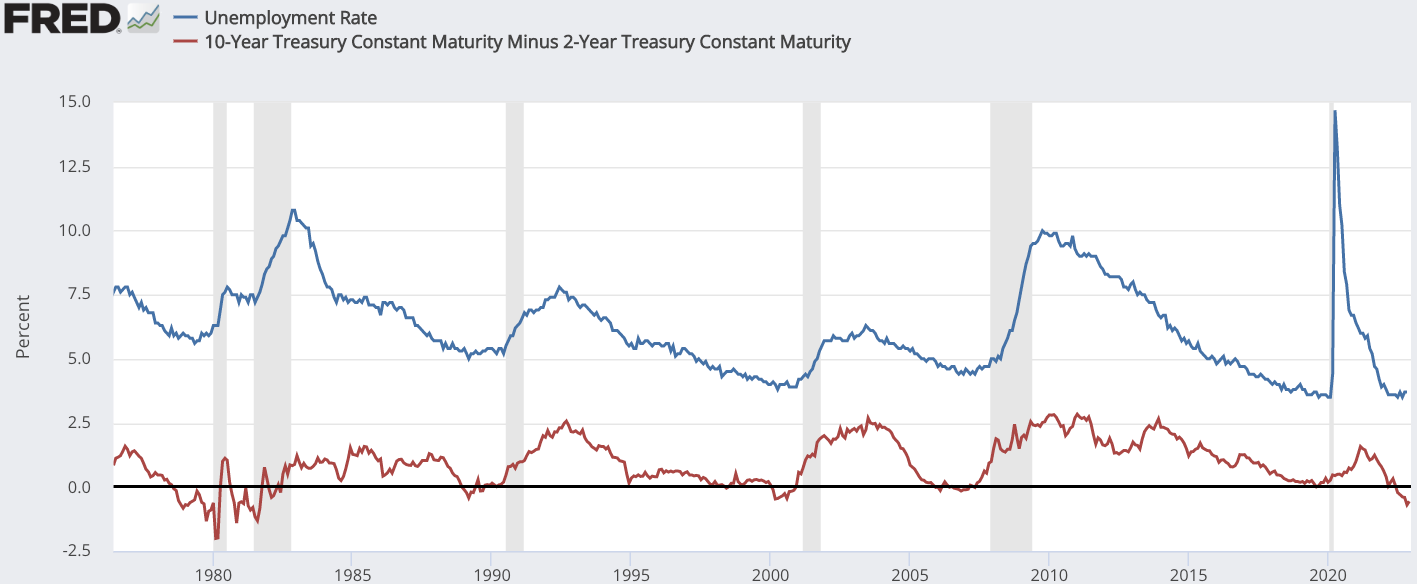
Inverted yield curves cause unemployment to go up, to get inflation or housing prices down Unemployment rate 10 year Treasury bond minus 2 year Treasury bond

The United States entered a recession in 1990, which lasted 8 months through March 1991. Although the recession was mild relative to other post-war recessions, it was characterized by a sluggish employment recovery, most commonly referred to as a jobless recovery. Unemployment continued to rise through June 1992, even though a positive economic growth rate had returned the previous year. The immediate causes of the recession were a generally weak economy and the 1990 oil price shock.

Belated recovery from the 1990–1991 recession contributed to Bill Clinton's victory in the 1992 presidential election over incumbent President George H. W. Bush.

== Background ==
Throughout 1989 and 1990, the economy was weakening as a result of restrictive monetary policy enacted by the Federal Reserve. At the time, the stated policy of the Fed was to reduce inflation, a process which limited economic expansion. The immediate cause of the recession was a loss of consumer and business confidence as a result of the 1990 oil price shock, coupled with an already weak economy. Another factor that may have contributed to the weakening of the economy was the Tax Reform Act of 1986, which lowered investment incentives and contributed to the end of the real estate valuation boom of the early to mid-1980s.

== Effects ==
July 1990 marked the end of what was at the time the longest peacetime economic expansion in U.S. history. Prior to the onset of the early 1990s recession, the nation enjoyed robust job growth and a declining unemployment rate. The Labor Department estimates that as a result of the recession, the economy shed 1.623 million jobs or 1.3% of non-farm payrolls. The bulk of these losses were in construction and manufacturing. Among the hardest hit regions were the New England states and the West Coast, while the Midwest and South Central regions were less affected.

== Recovery ==
Job losses and unemployment continued to rise and peaked at 7.8% in June 1992. Gross domestic product grew at a slow and erratic pace in the year that followed the official March 1991 end of the recession, but picked up pace in 1992. Exports, typically a driver of economic recovery, weakened due to persistent economic problems in Europe and Japan. Perhaps the largest impact on the protracted period of unemployment following the early 90s recession were large layoffs in defense related industries. Cumulative defense downsizing resulted in 240,000 job losses from 1990 to 1992, representing a full 10% reduction in that sector. These cutbacks also spilled over into transportation, wholesale, trade, and other sectors tied to defense related durable goods manufacturing. For all of 1991, the United States incurred a net loss of 858,000 jobs, with 1.154 million created in 1992 and 2.788 million in 1993.

Other factors contributed to a slow economy, including a slump in office construction resulting from overbuilding during the 1980s. Local markets in the New England states, Southern California, and Texas in particular experienced the effects of commercial overbuilding, reflected in the number of bank failures and the proportion of commercial investments held by those banks. Real estate values would remain depressed through 1995, when they would return to growth. In addition, consumer confidence moved at an erratic pace, limiting the surge in consumption expenditures that is typical of recovery periods. As a result, businesses were reluctant to hire on concerns over the strength of the economic recovery.

Ultimately, the recession proved to be one of the smallest and shortest in the modern era, underwhelmed in most metrics only by the early 2000s recession. The economy returned to 1980s level growth by 1993, fueled by the desktop computer productivity boom, low interest rates, low energy prices, and a resurgent housing market. Strong growth resumed and lasted through the year 2000. Although relatively mild, the early 1990s recession was the only interruption to economic expansion during the 1990s.
