= 2008 Bulgarian energy crisis =

Period of energy shortages in Bulgaria

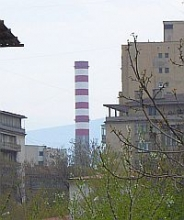
Chimney of the Zemlyane CHP plant in Sofia

The 2008 Bulgarian energy crisis emerged in late 2008, leaving over one million households—especially in Sofia, but also in Burgas, Pleven, and Vratsa—without centrally supplied gas heating due to mounting debts between Toplofikacia and Bulgargas, which led to disruptions in Russian gas deliveries; the shortage persisted into late September, but gas supplies were fully restored by January 2009 following the resolution of payment and supply disputes.

== Background ==
Bulgaria imports natural gas from Russia. It is used in combined heating plants in most Bulgarian cities in order to produce electricity during the summer months and heat during winter. In 2001, the Russian Gazprom signed an agreement with former Bulgarian Energy Minister Rumen Ovcharov which stated that Bulgaria would receive Russian gas at lower cost as a way to compensate for allowing the transfer of Russian gas through Bulgarian pipelines to other parts of Europe. Gas remained relatively cheap in Bulgaria until 2008 when Gazprom changed the terms of the contract. By then the price of gas had skyrocketed and Gazprom refused to sell cheap gas to Bulgaria. Meanwhile, a large embezzlement scandal raged in Sofia. The managing director of the central heating plant in Sofia Valentin Dimitrov was charged with fraud and stealing more than one million leva from the company. Valentin Dimitrov was initially sentenced in December 2010 to three years in prison for embezzling approximately BGN 2 million through lavish office renovations, luxury purchases (including a Jacuzzi installation), and unauthorized transfers to Austrian accounts. In 2009, he had also received a separate 14-year sentence for draining BGN 6 million from the company; however, these sentences were never enforced as the cases were delayed and appealed. In August 2022, after a 13-year trial, Sofia City Court convicted Dimitrov of money laundering, handing him a 7-year prison sentence and a fine of BGN 20,000, with all his assets subject to confiscation—though he remains free on BGN 3,000 cash bail, pending appeal. The citizens of Sofia were unable to pay the higher bills, some outright refused. In 2008 this led to huge losses of the Toplofikacia company and it ran into debt with the Bulgarian energy provider Bulgargas. Less than 50% of Sofia residents paid their bills regularly. Bulgargas started reducing the amount of gas to the company saying payment was long overdue.

== Vicious circle ==
With more than 50% of all consumers in Sofia refusing to pay their bills, Toplofikacia ran into debt with the Bulgarian energy provider Bulgargas. Bulgargas in turn said it was no longer able to pay to the Russian giant Gazprom. Gas supply has been restricted and even shut down in some cities. On September 25 Toplofikacia Sofia issued a statement saying it will not be able to provide enough heat to all residents of Sofia and that winter was fast approaching. As of late September the issue is unresolved.

== Shutting down pipes ==
Bulgargas shut down pipes providing gas to heating plants in Vratsa, Burgas and Pleven. Hospitals and kindergarten took emergency measures and installed boilers. Toplofikacia Sofia shut down the hot water of more than 100 buildings in Sofia where 90 to 100 percent of residents refused to pay.

== Political reaction ==
The Bulgarian energy minister Peter Dimitrov said customers were to blame as they refused to pay their bills. He said the municipality should help the company. The mayor of Sofia, Boyko Borisov said the state should interfere. As of late September 2008, the issue is unresolved and Gazprom will shut down supply of gas to all companies who were in debt, including the four plants in Sofia.

== Fears of grid failure ==
The combined heating plant in Sofia produces heat and electricity from natural gas. With supplies rapidly diminishing and winter fast approaching, more and more residents are switching on electrical heating devices and also boilers for hot water which usually Toplofikacia supplies. The National Electricity Company NEK EAD said grid failure was imminent if all households start using electricity for heating in the cold winter months.

== Outraged residents ==
The media have picked up the story and are broadcasting daily reports on the current crisis showing angry residents complaining that water was too cold, bills were exceptionally high or that their home will remain cold in winter because their neighbours have refused to pay their bills and Toplofikacia shuts down supply to all customers in the building. Around 80% of all Sofia residents live in apartment buildings eight stories or higher. If several families in the building refuse to pay, Toplofikacia shuts down supply to the whole building. This has caused huge outrage among the population, with reports of bickering among neighbours in the media. As of September 2008 the issue is unresolved and more and more buildings in Sofia are left with no hot water and no central heating.

== See also ==
- 2008 financial crisis
- Energy crisis
