= 2020s energy crisis (disambiguation) =

2020s energy crisis may refer to several energy shocks, and the subsequent supply chain impacts during the 2020s, including:

- the 2021-2023 energy crisis caused by a combination of the Russo-Ukrainian war and the impacts of COVID-19 pandemic, concentrated in Europe.
- the 2026 Strait of Hormuz crisis and its subsequent restriction of shipping of Gulf oil and gas to other parts of the world, concentrated most in Asia and Europe.
  - In countries with low refining capacity, this also lead to a 2026 Iran war fuel crisis
