= Energy-Quest =

Energy-Quest Logo

Energy-Quest (formerly The Hydrogen Expedition) was an organization launched in 2005 that sought to educate the public about the risks of an impending energy crisis due to the current worldwide dependence on fossil fuels and the benefits of energy conservation and the use of renewable energy sources. It intended to do so through a series of three record-setting ocean voyages:

1. The Earthrace
2. The Aurora Expedition
3. The Triton Expedition

Started and staffed by university students, the project was endorsed by several organizations and prominent individuals.

== The Earthrace ==
The Earthrace will be an attempt to break the speed record for circumnavigating the globe in a powerboat while using only renewable fuels. It is being supported by over 100 companies, and is led by New Zealander Pete Bethune. Energy-Quest is providing organizational and fundraising assistance to the Earthrace in the United States.

== The Aurora Expedition ==
The Aurora Expedition will involve an around-the-world voyage in a powerboat which, at 20 ft, will be the smallest vessel of its kind to ever complete such a journey. Due to its limited fuel capacity, the Aurora will rely on advanced fuel-efficient technologies for propulsion. Energy-Quest thus seeks to incorporate highly clean and efficient diesel engines, solar cells, and wind turbines into this design.

Aurora will stop at over forty major ports around the world, where she will showcase the cleanest and most efficient energy technologies available at the time, and her crew will promote the widespread use of such technologies. Ultimately, the Aurora Expedition is intended as a stepping stone towards the completion of the organization's final and most important endeavor – the Triton Expedition.

== The Triton Expedition ==
The Triton Expedition will be the first circumnavigation of the world by a boat powered solely by a hydrogen fuel cell. Triton will stop at major destinations around the world, where her crew will meet with local political and industrial leaders to promote the importance of alternative energy development. Through Triton's voyage, Energy-Quest hopes to generate international media attention, and in this way stimulate the development of a renewable energy-based hydrogen economy.

== History ==
The project was started in the summer of 2005 by Joseph F. Sahid, a graduate of the Phillips Exeter Academy and currently a sophomore at the University of Pennsylvania. He soon was joined by other volunteers, and an official team was rapidly assembled. The Energy Quest program has now been discontinued.

== Endorsements ==
Organisations who officially endorse the Hydrogen Expedition:

- Bluewater Network
- National Hydrogen Association of Australia
- Save the Planet USA
- Environment Colorado
- Italian Hydrogen and Fuel Cell Association
- HydrogenBoyz
