= 2011 United Kingdom public sector strikes =

Labour disputes in the United Kingdom

The 30 November 2011 UK Public Sector Pensions Strikes were a series of strikes over the whole of the United Kingdom. 60% of schools in England were closed and 6,000 hospital operations cancelled as up to two million public sector workers went on strike.

== Service disruption ==
The strike actions resulted in disruption of services including

- 19,000 out of 21,700 schools in England closed or partially closed.
- 6,000 out of 30,000 non-urgent medical operations cancelled.
- 135,000 civil servants on strike, representing just over a quarter of the civil service.

The Department for Education said 58% of 21,700 state schools in England were closed, with 13% of these partially shut down. In Scotland just 30 of the 2,700 council run schools remained open. In Wales around 80% were believed shut and in Northern Ireland more than 50% of 1,200 schools were closed.

In the health sector, NHS managers estimated that some 6,000 out of 30,000 routine operations had been cancelled throughout the UK, as well as tens of thousands of appointments. London Ambulance Service told the BBC that it was struggling and people not in a life-threatening condition might not get an ambulance.

The strike saw walkouts by tens of thousands of border agency staff, probation officers, radiographers, librarians, job centre staff, court staff, social workers, refuse collectors, midwives, road sweepers, cleaners, school meals staff, paramedics, tax inspectors, customs officers, passport office staff, police civilian staff, driving test examiners, patent officers and health and safety inspectors.

In Wales unions reported around 170,000 workers on strike, and in Scotland around 300,000.

Up to 1,000 marches and rallies took place across the UK. Four arrests were made ahead of the national rally in London, two for assaulting an officer and two for possession of a weapon.

== Reactions ==
UK Prime Minister David Cameron said that the strike was a "damp squib", with many key services continuing to operate. The government claimed that the turnout was "much lower" than the two million claimed by the unions. On The One Show, BBC presenter Jeremy Clarkson expressed his pleasure at the strikes leaving the roads empty, and claimed that he would kill the striking workers. "I would have them all shot", he said. "I would take them outside and execute them in front of their families". The One Show apologised at the end of the show to viewers who may have been offended by Jeremy Clarkson's comments.

YouGov reported that 40% of British people supported teachers going on strike and 49% opposed it. Figures were similar for civil servants striking, with 38% in support and 50% in opposition.

== See also ==
- 2012 United Kingdom fuel crisis
