= 1990 oil price shock =

In response to the Iraqi invasion of Kuwait

The 1990 oil price shock occurred in response to the Iraqi invasion of Kuwait on August 2, 1990, Saddam Hussein's second invasion of a fellow OPEC member. Lasting only nine months, the price spike was less extreme and of shorter duration than the previous oil crises of 1973–1974 and 1979–1980, but the spike still contributed to the early 1990s recession in the United States.

The average monthly price of oil rose from $17 per barrel in July to $36 per barrel in October. As the U.S.-led coalition experienced military success against Iraqi forces, concerns about long-term supply shortages eased and prices began to fall.

== Iraqi invasion of Kuwait and ensuing economic effects ==
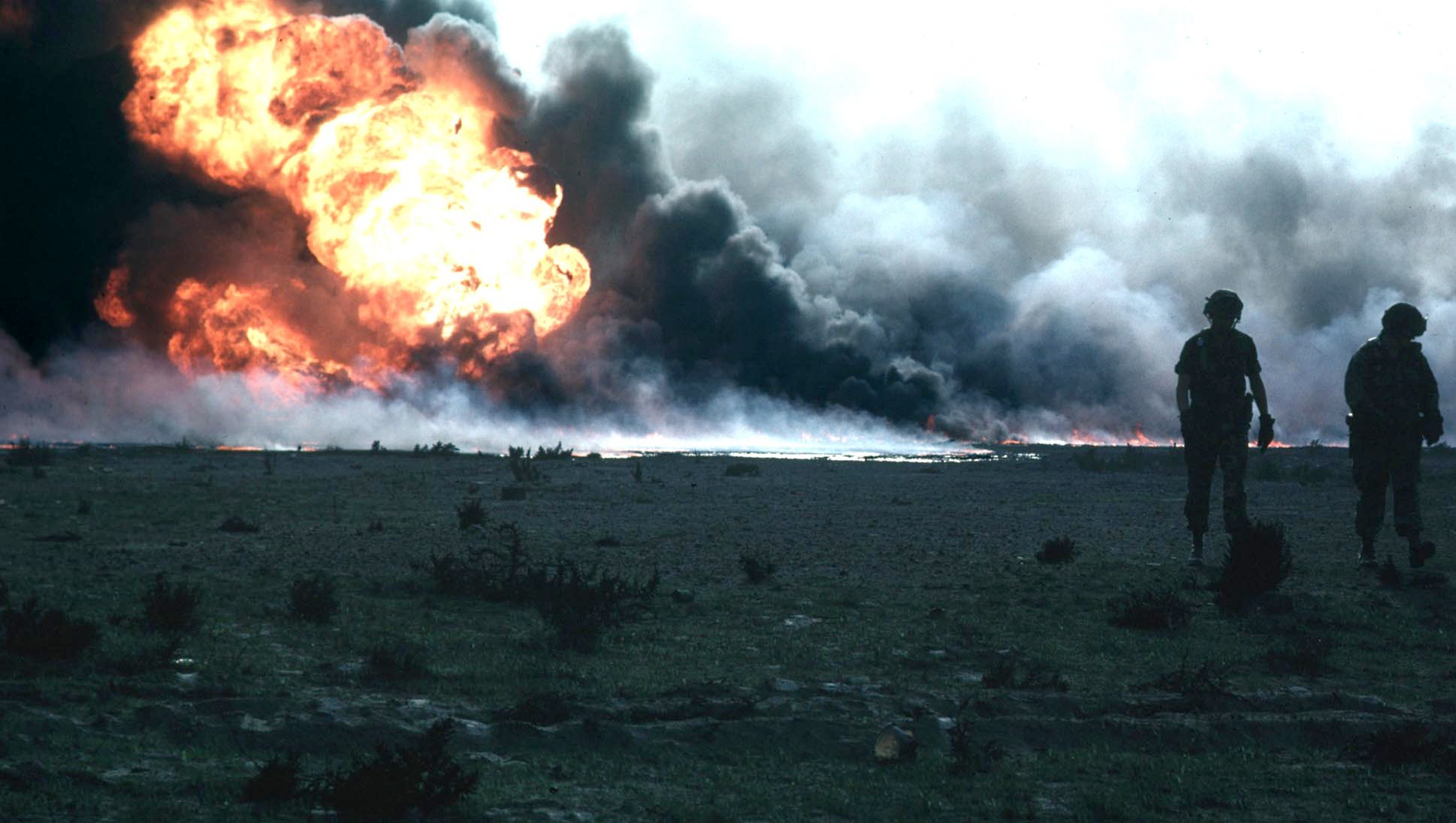
One of the hundreds of Kuwaiti oil fires set by retreating Iraqi forces in 1991

On August 2, 1990, the Republic of Iraq invaded the State of Kuwait, leading to a seven-month occupation of Kuwait and an eventual U.S.-led military intervention. While Iraq officially claimed Kuwait was stealing its oil via slant drilling, its true motives were more complicated and less clear. At the time of the invasion, Iraq owed Kuwait $14 billion of outstanding debt that Kuwait had loaned it during the 1980–1988 Iran–Iraq War. In addition, Iraq felt Kuwait was overproducing oil, lowering prices and hurting Iraqi oil profits in a time of financial stress.

In the buildup to the invasion, Iraq and Kuwait had been producing a combined 4.3 million barrels (680,000 m^{3}) of oil a day. The potential loss of these supplies, coupled with threats to Saudi Arabian oil production, led to a rise in prices from $21 per barrel at the end of July to $28 per barrel on August 6. On the heels of the invasion, prices rose to a peak of $46 per barrel in mid-October.

The United States' rapid intervention and subsequent military success helped to mitigate the potential risk to future oil supplies, thereby calming the market and restoring confidence. After only nine months, the spike had subsided, although the Kuwaiti oil fires set by retreating Iraqi forces were not completely extinguished until November 1991, and it took years for the two countries' combined production to regain its former level.

=== U.S. financial response ===
The U.S. Federal Reserve's monetary tightening in 1988 targeted the rapid inflation of the 1980s. By raising interest rates and lowering growth expectations, the Fed hoped to slow and eventually reduce inflationary pressures, creating greater price stability. The August 6 invasion was seen as a direct threat to the price stability the Fed sought. In fact, the Council of Economic Advisors published a consensus estimate that a one-year, 50 percent increase in the price of oil could temporarily raise the price level of the economy by one percent and potentially lower real output by the same amount.

Despite the potential for inflation, the U.S. Fed and central banks around the globe decided it would not be necessary to raise interest rates to counteract the rise in oil prices. Rather, the U.S. Federal Reserve decided to maintain interest rates as if the oil price spike were not occurring. This decision to refrain from action stemmed from confidence in the future success of Desert Storm to protect major oil-producing facilities in the Middle East and a will to maintain the long-term credibility of economy policy that had been built up during the 1980s.

To avoid being accused of inaction in the face of potential economic turbulence, the U.S. revised the Gramm–Rudman–Hollings Balanced Budget Act. Initially, the act prohibited the U.S. from changing budget deficit targets even in the event of a negative shock to the economy. When oil prices rose, revision of this act allowed the U.S. government to adjust its budget for changes in the economy, further mitigating the risk of rising prices. The result was a peak in prices at $46 per barrel in mid-October, followed by a steady decline in prices until 1994.

== See also ==
- Energy crisis
