= 2021 United Kingdom fuel supply crisis =

Panic buying of fuel

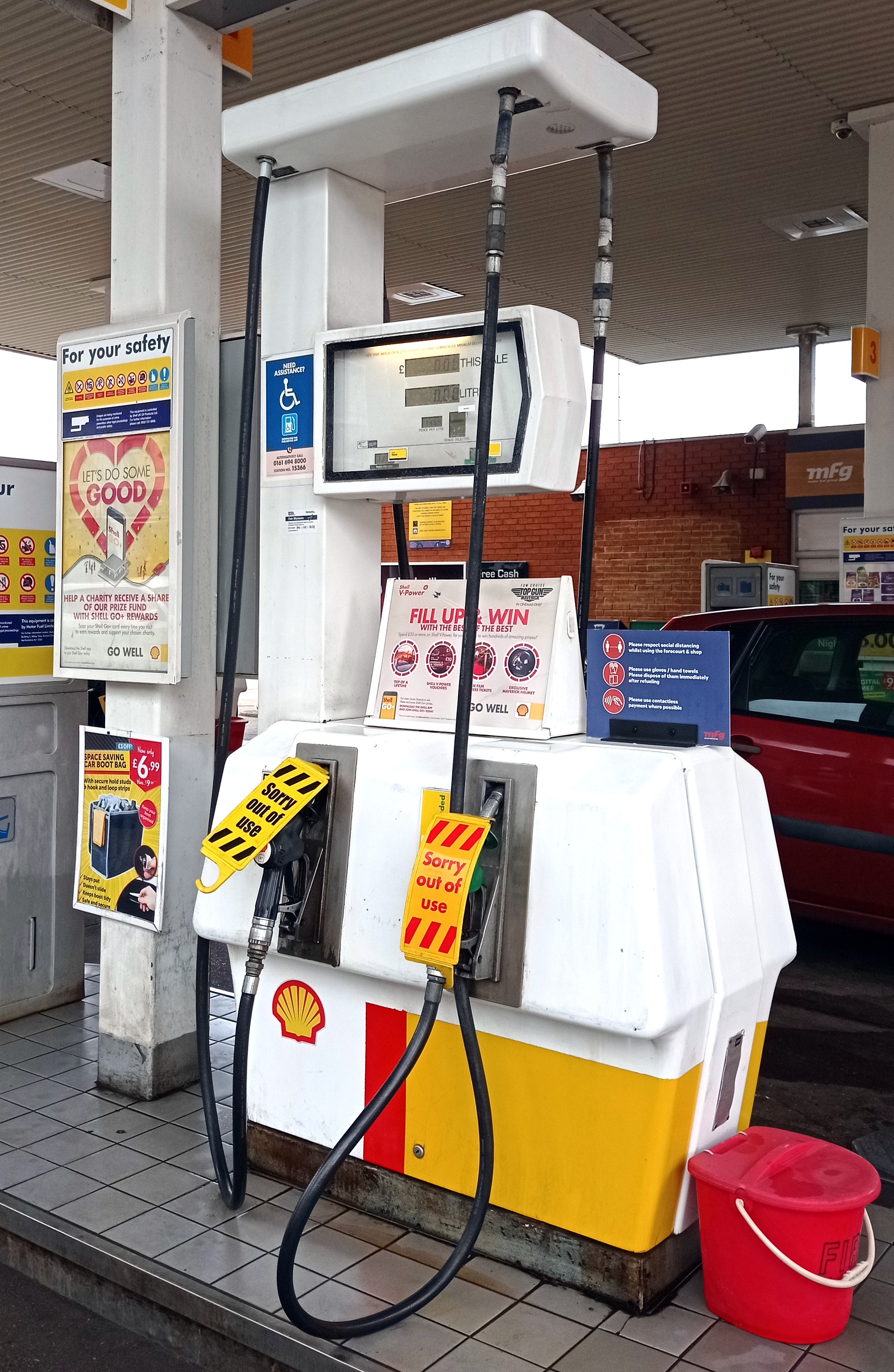
No fuel at a north London Shell service station 28 September 2021

The 2021 United Kingdom fuel supply crisis was a period of a few weeks in which petrol stations in some parts of the UK ran out of fuel.

In September 2021, almost 21 years since the last fuel crisis, which took place in September 2000, panic buying of fuel was reported to be caused by media reports of a leaked government briefing discussing the shortage of heavy goods vehicle (HGV) drivers. Some analysts and politicians linked the driver shortage to Brexit, whilst others blamed the COVID-19 pandemic, or their combined impact. Although the UK did not have a shortage of fuel, the panic buying of fuel combined with supply chain issues caused by the media and the HGV driver shortage led to many petrol stations running out of fuel.

By 22 October 2021, fuel station stocks were at their highest level since May.

== Problem ==
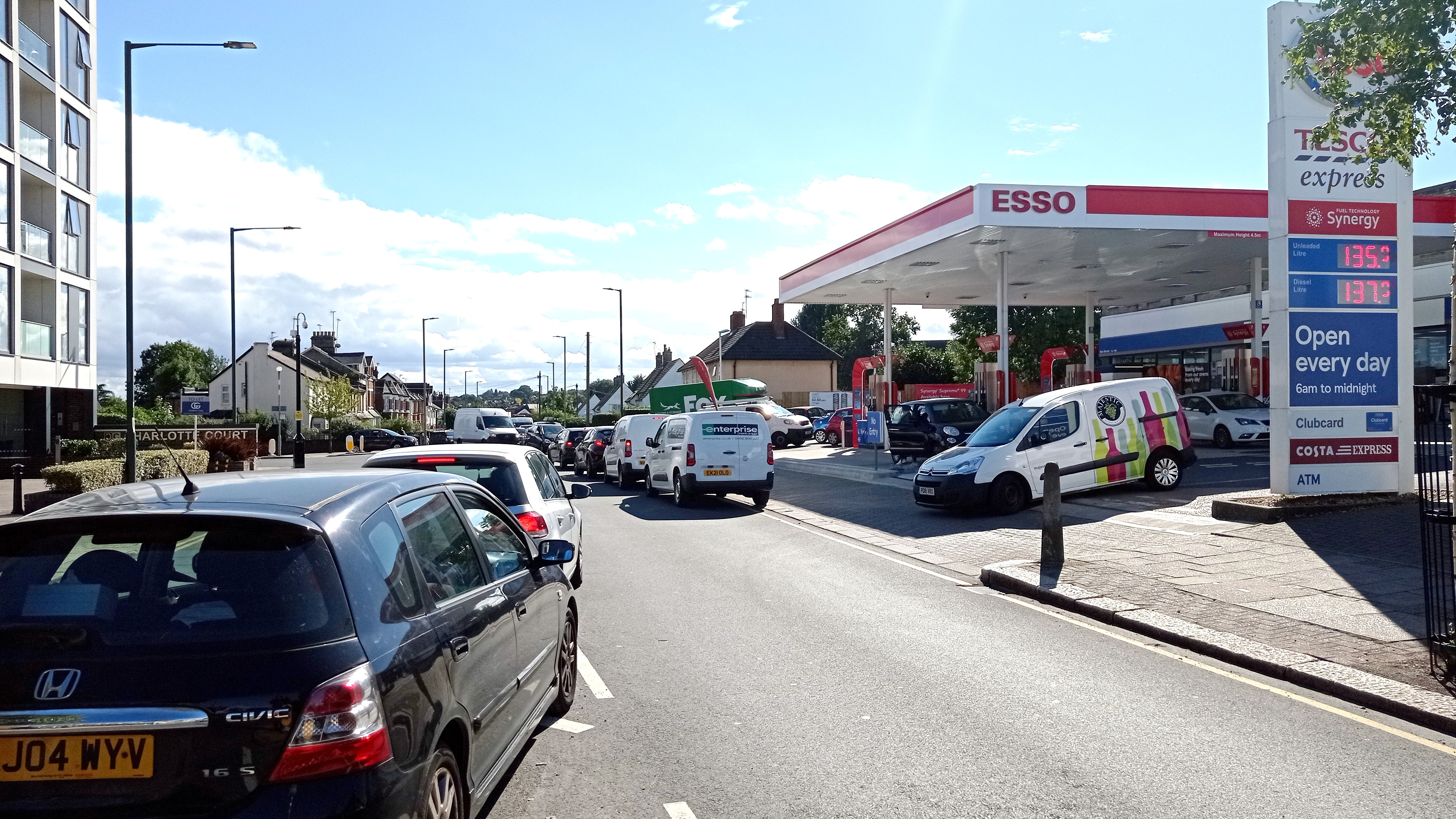
Queues for fuel at an Esso petrol station in East Barnet, North London on 27 September 2021

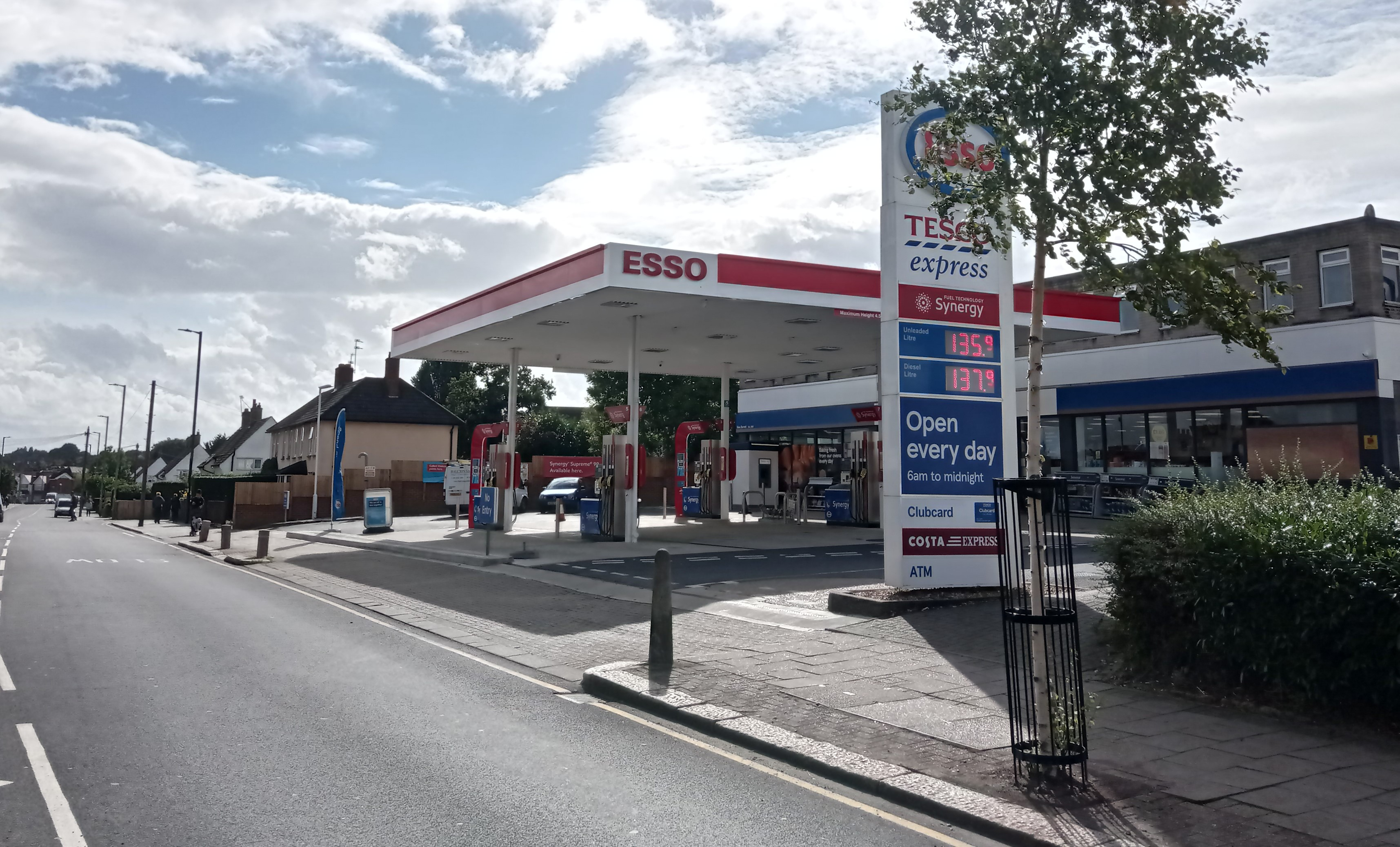
Same location 24 hours later, all fuel sold out

In September 2021, Great Britain suffered a fuel supply shortage for a few weeks after news reports of an ongoing lack of HGV drivers spurred panic buying of fuel. Forecourts in Northern Ireland were not affected.

By 26 September 2021, BP, which operates 1,200 stations in the United Kingdom, estimated that 30% of their sites did not have either of the main grades of fuel, unleaded 95 RON petrol and "standard" diesel". In turn, this led to higher rates of consumption of "super" unleaded and diesel which are typically available on UK forecourts, until they also ran out. Suppliers then focused on supply of standard grades, creating extended pressure on the supply of the premium grades which some vehicles require. On 27 September, Reuters reported that 50 to 90% of fuel stations in some regions of England had run dry.

Businesses involved in the fuel industry said in a joint statement on 29 September that they were "now seeing signs that the situation at the pumps has begun to improve". A week after the panic buying had started, getting petrol in the South East of England was still a problem, although the situation had improved in the north and the Midlands. The chairman of the Petrol Retailers Association said in a radio interview on 2 October that the situation was improving in Scotland, the North of England and parts of the Midlands but worsening in the South East of England and London. On the following day, the organisation issued a statement stating that "The fuel is still not going to the pumps that need it most in London and the South East... [but the] crisis is virtually at an end in Scotland, the North and Midlands". 22% of stations in London and the South-East remained without fuel and 40% were lacking one of the main fuel grades. By October, some garage owners believed the remaining supply issues were no longer linked to panic buying. On 4 October, the Petrol Retailers Association said some forecourts in South East England had been without fuel for a week.

On 13 October, Asda reported not having had a shortage of fuel for a week, and by 22 October the BBC reported that stock levels in service station storage tanks were at their highest levels since May.

== Easing measures ==
In 2011 the British Government published guidance for energy emergency planning and priority fuel allocation, listing 10 schemes which could be implemented in the event of a fuel supply or demand issue. Due to problems with the supply chain in January 2021, one of these schemes, the relaxation of drivers' hours, had already been implemented earlier in the year and subsequently extended to October, so it was already in place when the panic started. On 26 September UK Business Secretary Kwasi Kwarteng announced the oil industry will be exempted from the Competition Act 1998 so that companies can coordinate and deliver petroleum products easier in light of fuel shortages brought on by panic buying. On 28 September, a number of military tanker drivers were placed on standby to be deployed if deemed necessary. On 29 September, Kwasi Kwarteng tweeted that the Reserve Tanker fleet which consists of 80 vehicles would be released on that afternoon.

On 2 October it was announced that the army would start to deliver fuel to filling stations on Monday 4 October and that 300 foreign tanker drivers would immediately be temporarily allowed to work in the UK until the end of March 2022.

== Causes ==
The fuel supply problems and panic buying have been widely debated in the media, with the causes attributed to a range of possible triggers.

=== Panic buying ===
==== Trigger ====
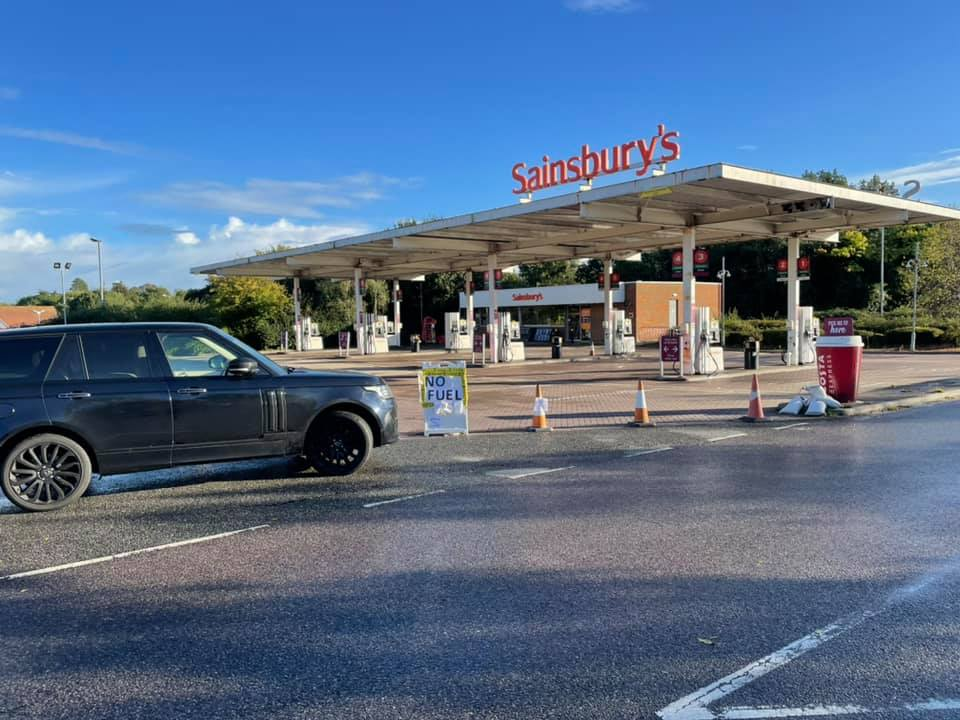
Empty Sainsbury's filling station in Ashford, Kent, October 2021

Multiple sources have stated that an industry task force meeting took place on Zoom on 16 September where BP fuel stock levels were discussed. It has been alleged that the notes from this meeting were then passed to ITV who reported on the contents of the meeting. The chair of the Petrol Retailers Association blamed the leaking of the information about BP stock levels for the panic. On 26 September, Grant Shapps, the transport secretary, accused road haulage associations of purposefully briefing the information to the media to help bolster their arguments for more European drivers stating: "I know that they're desperate to have more European drivers undercutting British salaries, I know that's been their ask all along." The Road Haulage Association has denied these allegations.

==== Effect ====
An analysis by i of fuel delivery data showed that although there was a slight dip in forecourt stock levels just before it, that during the supply crisis fuel deliveries to forecourts did not drop significantly and concluded, based on comparisons with historic supply and demand level patterns, that panic buying was the cause of any shortages.

==== Aggravating factors ====
Fuel retailers say that in the run up to the introduction of E10 petrol, planned for 1 September 2021, that they had already been emptying their tanks ready to make the change when the panic buying took hold and quickly drained them. On 7 October 2021 official figures showed that although petrol station deliveries had been consistent throughout the summer and most of September, that fuel stocks at forecourts fell by up to 25% after the introduction of E10 fuel on 1 September. When panic buying started on 24 September, there was not enough fuel in forecourt storage tanks to keep up with demand. In an examination of the just-in-time (JIT) logistics model, Sky News suggests that, because panic buying had led to a sudden depletion of fuel stocks in forecourts, that the JIT delivery strategy was unable to react quickly enough to supply the sudden increase in demand.

=== Brexit ===
Former chief negotiator EU to the UK Michel Barnier, Candidate for Chancellor of Germany Olaf Scholz, French Secretary of State for European Affairs Clement Beaune, and Deputy Leader of Ireland Leo Varadkar, linked the crisis to Brexit – the UK's withdrawal from the EU. Former Conservative MP Anna Soubry and Shadow Justice Secretary David Lammy also suggested Brexit was a factor. On the other hand, Grant Shapps, the UK transport secretary, had said that driver shortage was a problem in Europe, and that Brexit had helped the UK to "provide a solution". However, Shapps later admitted that Brexit had been "a factor".

The Grocer trade magazine reported a loss of 12,500 EU drivers from the UK before the start of the COVID-19 pandemic, around 18% of the overall shortfall of 70,000 HGV drivers in Britain. It cited drivers choosing to work elsewhere or not work due to working conditions, retirement, the lack of driving tests during the pandemic lockdown, and changes in taxation as major causes. BBC News also noted a fall of 25,000 drivers passing HGV driver tests between 2019 and 2020 and changes to IR35 tax rules which made it more expensive for EU drivers to work in the UK. ITV News also cited high rates of attrition in haulage firm staffing.

Industry commentators have noted that despite driver shortages, EU countries have not experienced supply problems to petrol station forecourts, and this has been attributed to the greater flexibility of labour deployment and cabotage within the European Single Market. According to the BBC, the market research organisation Transport Intelligence found significant HGV shortages in Poland and Germany, but noted that these countries were able to rely on a Europe-wide pool of labour to mitigate for these shortages. Richard Burnett, CEO of the Road Haulage Association expressed the view that the driver shortage could only be solved by "access to temporary foreign labour in the short term to recruit a UK-based workforce for the longer term".

=== COVID-19 pandemic ===
BBC News Online noted that the COVID-19 pandemic was one of a number of key causes for the shortfall of HGV drivers, and noted that the lockdown had contributed to a significant fall in the number of candidates passing HGV driver tests. Members of Parliament Lucy Allan and Philip Dunne identified the impact of the COVID-19 pandemic as a cause.

== See also ==
- 2012 United Kingdom fuel crisis
- 1973 oil crisis
- Fuel protests in the United Kingdom
- 2021 United Kingdom natural gas supplier crisis
- Global energy crisis (2021–2023)
- 2021–2023 global supply chain crisis
