= Il Boom =

- Directed by: Vittorio De Sica
- Written by: Cesare Zavattini
- Produced by: Dino De Laurentiis
- Starring: Alberto Sordi; Gianna Maria Canale
- Cinematography: Armando Nannuzzi
- Edited by: Adriana Novelli
- Music by: Piero Piccioni (Wheels composed by Billy Vaughn)
- Release date: 30 August 1963
- Running time: 97 minutes
- Country: Italy
- Language: Italian

Il Boom is a 1963 commedia all'italiana black-and-white film directed by Vittorio De Sica.

The 'boom' in the title refers to the Italian economic miracle which transformed the country in the span of a decade, from the late 1950s to the onset of the 1970s.

== Plot ==
Giovanni Alberti, a small building contractor in the years of the boom, is heavily in debt because of his poor skills in business but above all because of his high standard of living, which he strives to maintain at all costs, even pressured by his beautiful and frivolous wife Silvia (Gianna Maria Canale), whom he loves deeply. Giovanni is unable to repay a large loan. His mother is the only person who would be willing to help him, but she is not rich enough to.

After calls on family and friends for financial support, suddenly the wife of a rich manufacturer, Mrs. Bausetti, gives him a private appointment advancing an attractive deal. Giovanni suspects that the elderly lady wishes to be his lover, but in fact Mrs. Bausetti, used to getting all that she wants with her money and her cold, dismissive and seemingly conciliatory manner, wants Giovanni to sell a cornea to her husband, who not long before had been blinded in one eye by an accident with quicklime. They could afford to, the woman calmly explains, obtain the cornea implant from a dead stranger, but it is preferable to propose such an arrangement, though obviously illegal, to a young and healthy man in need of money.

Meanwhile, the news that Giovanni is ruined spreads. Silvia, feeling betrayed and forced to give up prosperity, never considers the idea of making sacrifices to help her husband, but returns to the family home with her two-year-old son. Giovanni, desperate from the abandonment of his wife, ends up accepting the secret proposal of the Bausettis and accepts some money in advance, thinking about the proposition for the next week. With the money, which he claims to have won in a lucky deal, Giovanni organizes a lavish reception in his splendid apartment in the EUR district, to revenge himself on acquaintances who had humiliated him and to regain the esteem of Silvia, who, removed from the spectre of poverty, does not hesitate to make up and to declare herself proud of him.

Everything seems to go smoothly, but the removal of the eye remains. Giovanni, pretending to his wife that he is going on a business trip, is in the private clinic with Bausetti as agreed, but at the time of the operation Giovanni runs away in despair. The intervention of Mrs. Bausetti, as usual polished and controlling, manages to convince him to live up to the agreement: even assuming that Giovanni gave up the money offered by the couple and gave them back the advance payment, how would he remedy his hardship, and therefore keep his family together? Giovanni, resigned, goes back to the clinic.

== Cast ==
- Alberto Sordi - Giovanni Alberti
- Gianna Maria Canale - Silvia Alberti
- Ettore Geri - Mr. Bausetti
- Elena Nicolai - Mrs. Bausetti
- Alceo Barnabei - Baratti
- Federico Giordano - Silvia's father
- Antonio Mambretti - Faravalli
- Silvio Battistini - Riccardo
- Sandro Merli - Dronazzi
- John Karlsen - Occulist
- Ugo Silvestri - Gardinazzi
- Gloria Cervi - Mrs. Baratti
- Gino Pasquarelli - Director
- Maria Grazia Buccella - Secretary
- Mariolina Bovo - Mrs. Faravalli

== Title ==
At the time, Italian media had adopted an English word, 'boom', to refer to the Italian economic miracle, while other countries opted for national words like Wirtschaftswunder and Trente Glorieuses to describe similar phenomena.
