= Trente Glorieuses =

1945–1975 period of French economic growth

Les Trente Glorieuses
- 1945–1975
World War II
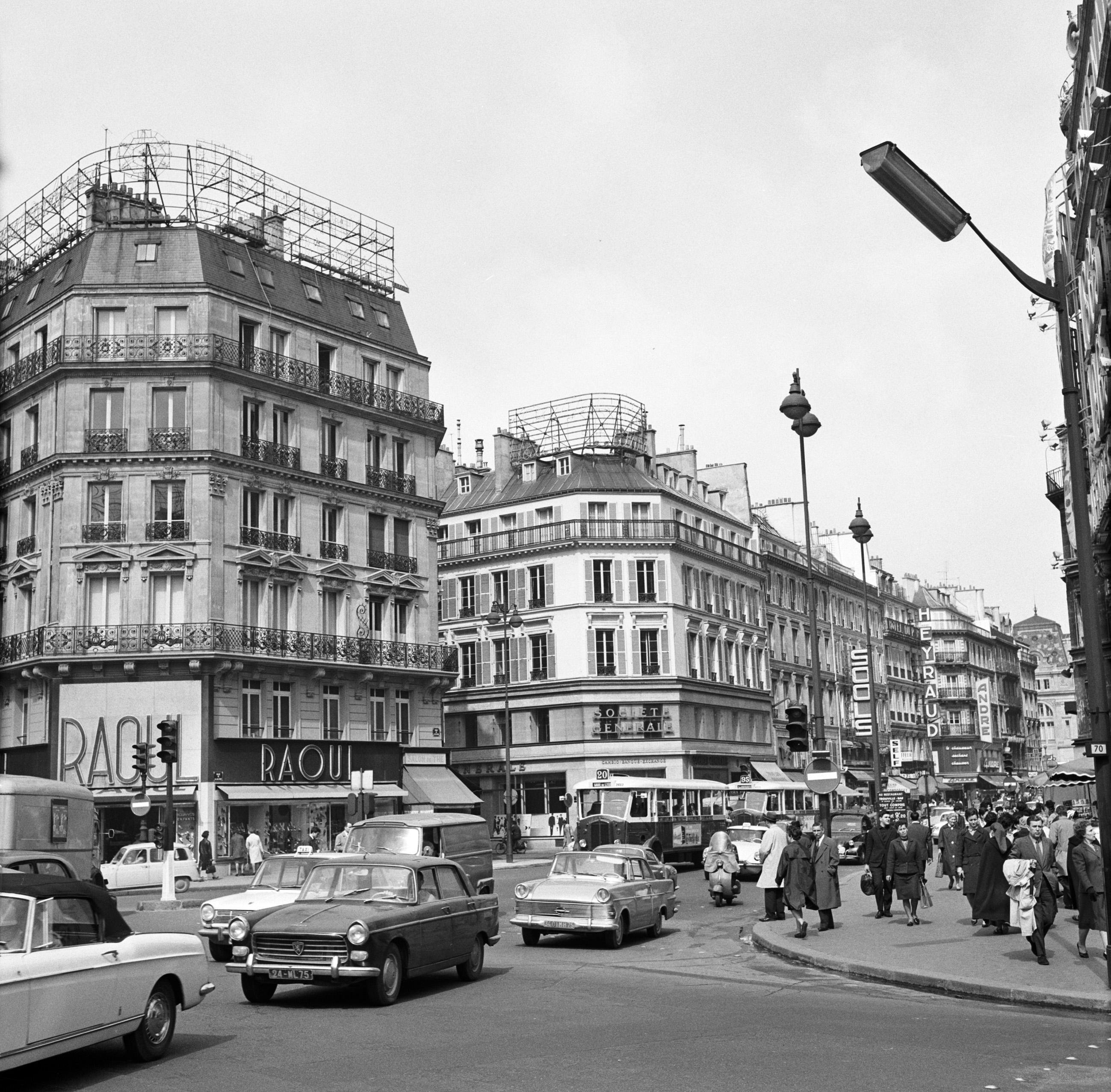
- Location: France and its colonies
- President(s): Vincent Auriol; René Coty; Charles de Gaulle; Alain Poher (acting); Georges Pompidou; Valéry Giscard d'Estaing
- Key events: Establishments of the Fourth (1946) and Fifth (1958) Republics; Indochina War; Suez Crisis; Algerian War; May 68; 1973 oil crisis

Les Trente Glorieuses (French pronunciation: [le tʁɑ̃t ɡlɔʁjøz]; lit. 'The Thirty Glorious (Years)') was a thirty-year period of economic growth in France between 1945 and 1975, following the end of the Second World War.

== Etymology ==
The name was first used by the French demographer Jean Fourastié, who coined the term in 1979 with the publication of his book Les Trente Glorieuses, ou la révolution invisible de 1946 à 1975 ('The Glorious Thirty, or the Invisible Revolution from 1946 to 1975'). The term is derived from Les Trois Glorieuses ('The Glorious Three'), the three days of revolution from 27 to 29 July 1830 in France.

== Dynamics ==
As early as 1944, after returning to a still partially occupied France as leader of the Free French, Charles de Gaulle introduced a dirigiste economic policy, which included substantial state-directed control over a capitalist economy that since 1940 had been controlled by German occupation. This was followed by thirty years of unprecedented growth, known as the Trente Glorieuses. Over this thirty-year period, France's economy grew rapidly, like economies of other developed countries within the framework of the Marshall Plan, such as West Germany, Italy, and Japan.

From 1946 to 1950, France, paralysed by an obsolete economy and infrastructure, did not achieve real growth, and living conditions remained very difficult after the war and the penury which resulted from it. The cost of living rose. Rationing, present until 1947–1948, and the housing crisis accentuated the problems of a people still scarred by World War II.

With restored borders and tariffs, this interchange was limited. With the 1951 introduction of the "Montanunion" European Coal and Steel Community trade according to supranational High Authority decisions, efficiency and prosperity rose.

These decades of economic prosperity combined high productivity with high average wages and high consumption, and were also characterised by a highly developed system of social benefits. The real purchasing power of the average French worker's salary went up by 170% between 1950 and 1975, while overall private consumption increased by 174% in the period 1950–1974.

The French standard of living, which had been damaged by both World Wars, became one of the world's highest. The population became far more urbanised. Many rural départements experienced a population decline, while the larger metropolitan areas grew considerably, especially Paris. Ownership of household goods and amenities increased considerably, while the wages of the French working class rose significantly as the economy became more prosperous. As noted by the historians Jean Blondel and Donald Geoffrey Charlton in 1974,

If it is still the case that France lags in the number of its telephones, working-class housing has improved beyond recognition and the various 'gadgets' of the consumer society—from television to motor cars—are now purchased by the working class on an even more avid basis than in other Western European countries.

In 1977, 67.8% of households by that time had a car, 75% a washing machine, 80% a vacuum cleaner, 77% a food mixer, 88% a television, 43% a cassette recorder, 94% a still camera and 95% a transistor radio, while in 1976 13% of households had a radio recorder, 47% a tape recorder, and 47% a record player.

In his 2013 book Capital in the Twenty-First Century, French economist Thomas Piketty describes the Trente Glorieuses as an exceptional 'catch up' period following the two world wars. He cites statistics showing that normal growth in wealthy countries is about 1.5–2%, whereas in Europe growth dropped to 0.5% between 1913 and 1950, and then 'caught up' with a growth rate of 4% between 1950 and 1970, until settling back to 1.5–2% from 1970 onward.

== See also ==
- Economic history of France
- Japanese economic miracle
- Italian economic miracle
- Greek economic miracle
- Post–World War II economic expansion
- Record years
- Spanish miracle
- Wirtschaftswunder
