= Record years =

Period of Swedish economic history

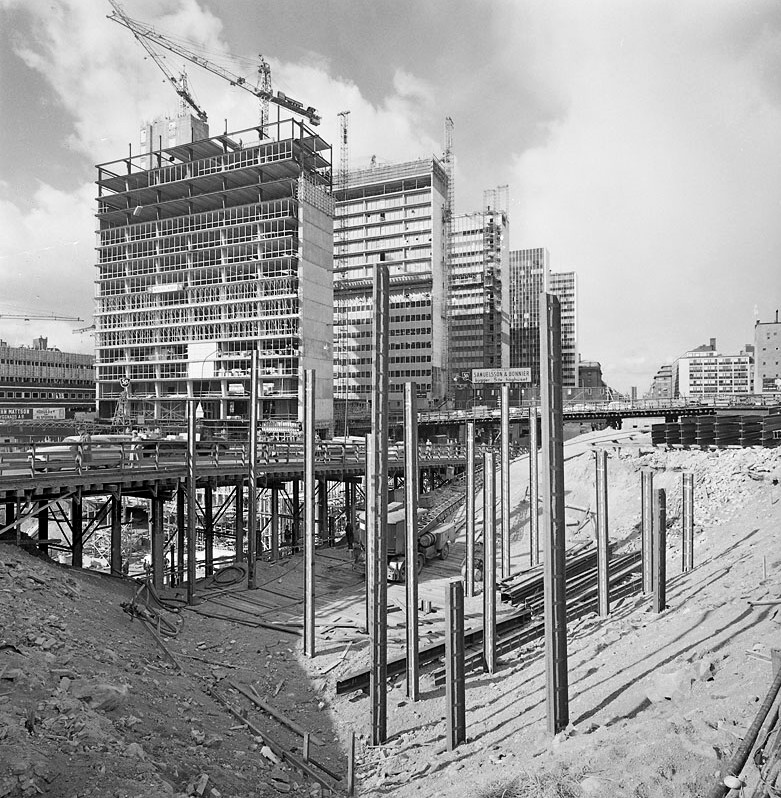
The redevelopment of Norrmalm, downtown Stockholm, in 1963

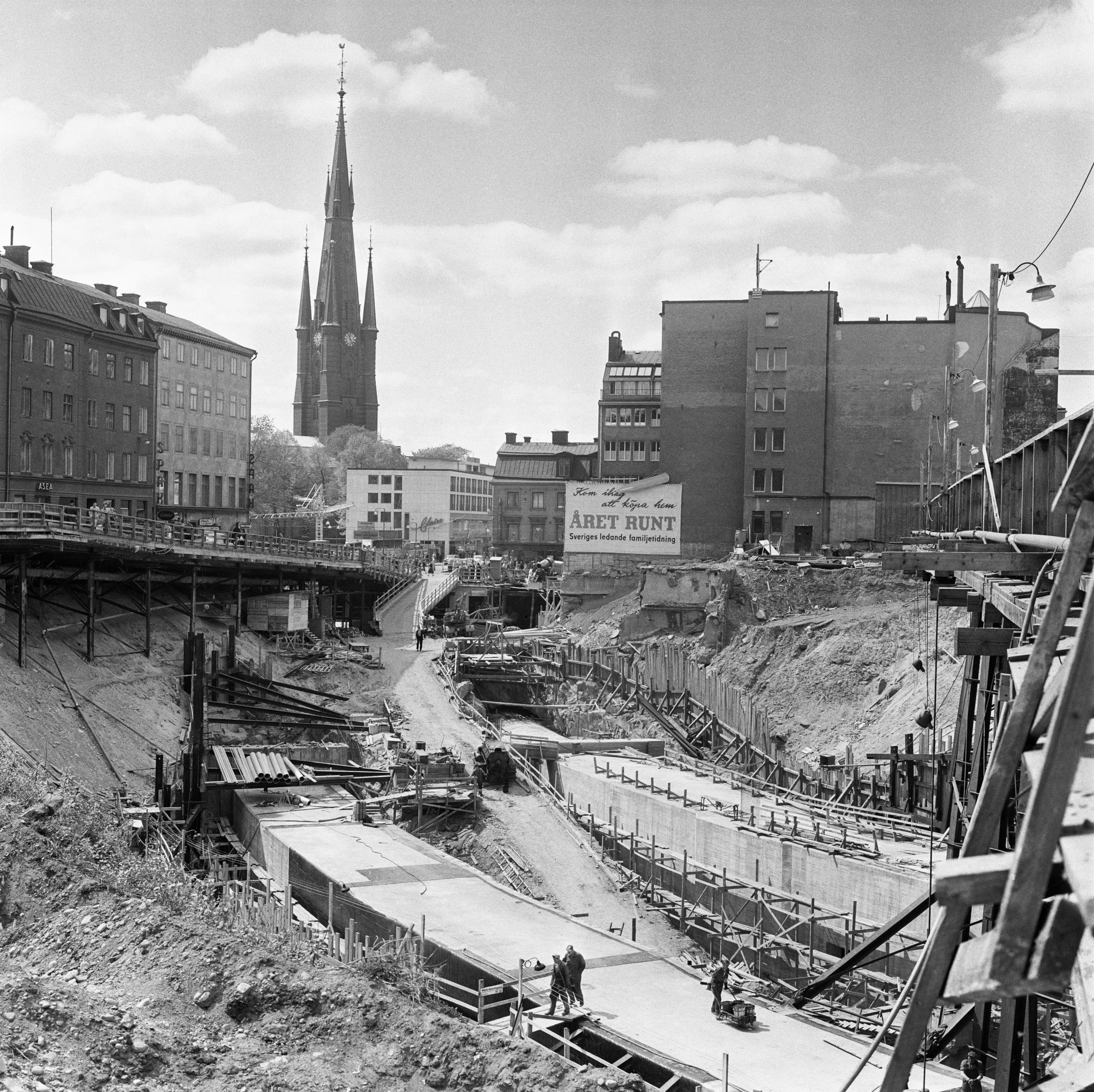
The redevelopment of Norrmalm and the Stockholm Metro

The record years (Swedish: rekordåren) is a period in the economy of Sweden, dating from the international post–World War II economic expansion to the 1973 oil crisis, and largely coinciding with the mandates of prime ministers Tage Erlander and earliest years of Olof Palme. The concept was originally a satirical left-wing description of the years 1968 to 1970.

Sweden had maintained neutrality during both world wars, and entered the post-war boom with industrial and demographic advantages. Sweden also received aid from the Marshall Plan. Between 1947 and 1974, the Swedish economy grew at an average rate of 12.5% annually. The urban population, living in towns of over 15,000 people, grew from 38% of the total population in 1931 to 74% by 1973. Sustained by an export boom of automobiles, heavy machinery, electronics, shipbuilding, and heavy weapons, the per capita income increased by as much as 2,000%. Sweden had successfully moved into the high-income group of countries by 1955–56.

== See also ==
- History of Sweden (1945–67)
- Folkhemmet
- Million Programme
- Trente Glorieuses
- Japanese post-war economic miracle
- Italian economic miracle
- Wirtschaftswunder
