= Wirtschaftswunder =

Post-World War II rapid reconstruction of West Germany and Austria

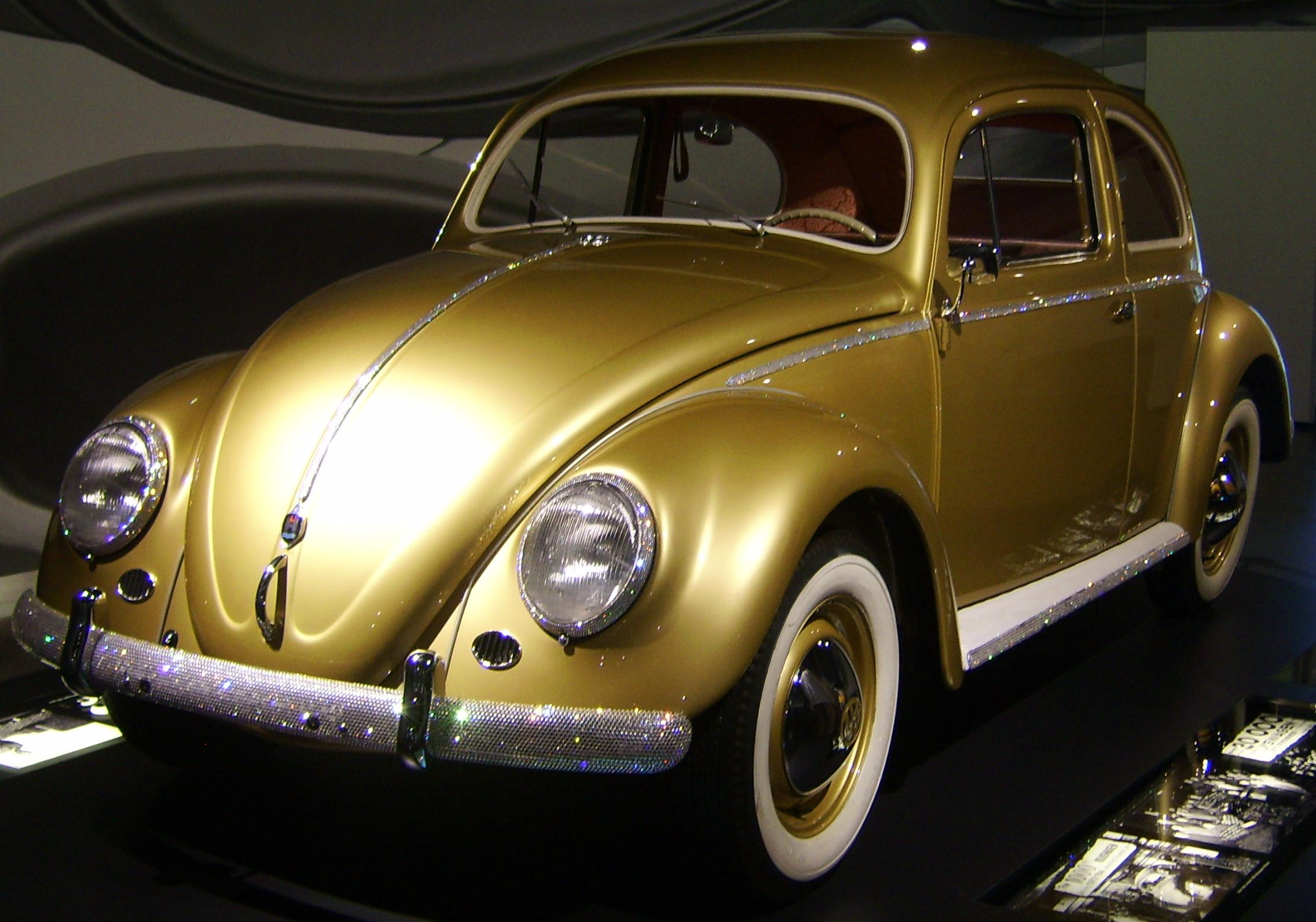
The Volkswagen Beetle was an icon of post-war West German reconstruction. The pictured example is a one-off version manufactured to celebrate the production of a million cars of the type.

The Wirtschaftswunder (German: [ˈvɪʁt.ʃaftsˌvʊndɐ], lit. 'economic miracle'), also known as the Miracle on the Rhine, was the rapid reconstruction and development of the economies of West Germany and Austria after World War II. Wirtschaftswunder was first used to refer to this phenomenon by The Times in 1950.

Beginning with the replacement of the Reichsmark with the Deutsche Mark in 1948 as legal tender (the Schilling was similarly re-established in Austria), a lasting era of low inflation and rapid industrial growth was overseen by the government led by West German Chancellor Konrad Adenauer and his Minister of Economics, Ludwig Erhard, who went down in history as the "father of the West German economic miracle". In Austria, efficient labour practices led to a similar period of economic growth.

The era of economic growth raised West Germany and Austria from total wartime devastation to developed nations in modern Europe. At the founding of the European Common Market in 1957, West Germany's economic growth stood in contrast to the struggling conditions at the time in the United Kingdom.

== West Germany ==
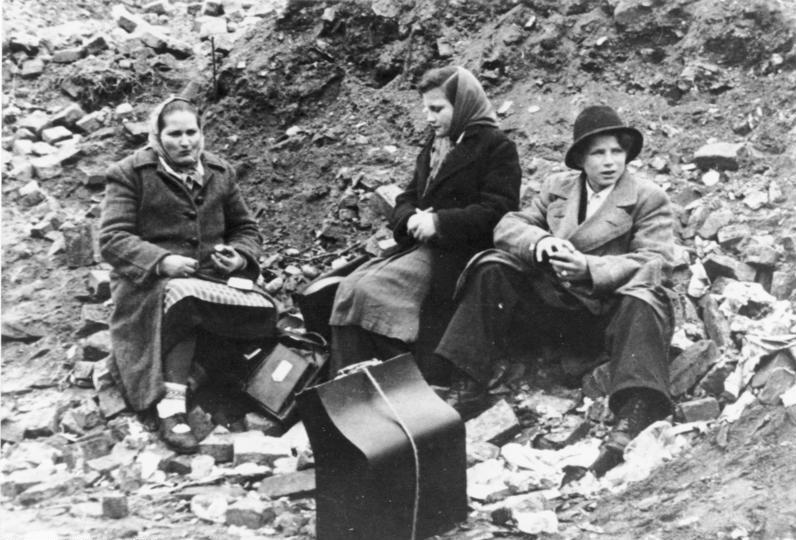
German refugees from the east in Berlin in 1945

The fundamental reason for the quick economic recovery of West Germany can be found in the ordoliberal growth model. Germany had a skilled workforce and a high level of technological experience in 1946, but its capital stock had largely been destroyed during and after the war. The disadvantage of the small capital stock was compounded by the difficulty in converting the German economy to the production of civilian goods, as well as by rampant monetary and regulatory problems, leading to unusually low economic output during the first post-war years.

These initial problems were overcome by the time of the Currency Reform of 1948, which replaced the Reichsmark with the Deutsche Mark as legal tender, halting rampant inflation. This act to strengthen the West German economy had been explicitly forbidden during the two years when JCS 1067 was in effect. JCS 1067 had directed the U.S. forces of occupation in Germany to "take no steps looking toward the economic rehabilitation of Germany".

At the same time, the West German government, following Erhard's advice, cut taxes sharply on moderate incomes. Walter Heller, a young economist with the U.S. occupation forces (he would later become chairman of the Council of Economic Advisers under President of the United States John F. Kennedy), wrote in 1949 that to "remove the repressive effect of extremely high rates, Military Government Law No. 64 cut a wide swath across the German tax system at the time of the currency reform". Individual income-tax rates, in particular, fell dramatically. Previously the tax rate on any income over 6,000 Deutschmark had been 95 percent. After tax reform, this 95 percent rate applied only to annual incomes above 250,000 Deutschmark. For the West German resident with an annual income of about 2,400 Deutschmark in 1950, the marginal tax rate fell from 85 percent to 18 percent.

Erhard also issued a decree abolishing price controls. This move was conducted against the recommendation of the Allied occupying powers, and was opposed by the Social Democratic Party, by most West German manufacturing interests, and (according to Erhard) by at least some of his own advisers. At the time, food was difficult to find on sale at the artificially low price, and was instead often acquired by barter or through the black market. Once the price controls were removed, the shortages disappeared and the economy improved dramatically. The removal of price controls returned supply and demand to equilibrium. Once the goods could be sold for the higher price that reflected the cost of production, it incentivised producers to increase production, ultimately increasing economic efficiency.

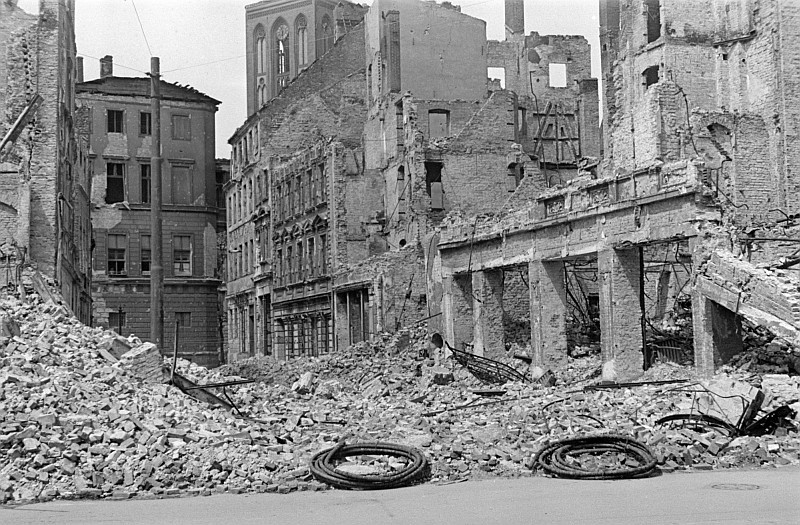
War damage in a German city in Saxony in 1945

The Allied dismantling of the West German coal and steel industries, as decided at the Potsdam Conference, was virtually completed by 1950; equipment had then been removed from 706 manufacturing plants in the west and steel-production capacity had been reduced by 6,700,000 tons. Although the industrially important Saarland with its rich coal fields was returned to West Germany in 1957, it remained economically integrated in a customs union with France until 1959, and France extracted coal from the area until 1981.

After 1948 West Germany proceeded quickly to rebuild its capital stock and thus to increase its economic output at stunning rates. The very high capital-investment rate thanks to low consumption and a very small need for replacement capital investments (due to the still small capital stock) drove this recovery during the 1950s. Living standards also rose steadily, with the purchasing power of wages increasing by 73% from 1950 to 1960. As noted by the British journalist Terence Prittie in the early 1960s:

Today the German working-man leads a comfortable life and wears a well-filled waistcoat. He eats well, and his food – although German cooking lacks the elegance of French – is wholesome and appetizing. He buys good clothes, and he dresses his wife and children well. He generally has money to spare for television sets, week-end excursions and football matches. And he is not afraid of celebrating occasionally on a grander scale.

Productivity growth in West Germany enabled most workers to obtain significant improvements in their living standards and 'security of life'. David Eversley wrote:

As real incomes rose, so public authorities were enabled (and indeed encouraged) to raise funds, both from taxation and through borrowing, to accelerate the rate of investment and current spending in projects which are partly immediately productive, partly conducive to the creation of the good life, as seen in Germany ... Any superficial examination of the German townscape, let alone perusal of the statistics, shows that Germany has spent sums on hospitals, libraries, theaters, schools, parks, railway-stations, socially-aided housing, underground railways, airports, museums, and so on which are simply not to be compared with British efforts in this direction.

In the sphere of management, the widespread doctrines of the Harzburg Model adapted German traditions of militarism to the Wirtschaftswunder.

Since West Germany had no army before the establishment of the Bundeswehr in 1955, there was little military spending.

The rise in living standards was reflected in the ownership of various items. From 1962 to 1973, the percentage of households with refrigerators rose from 52% to 93%, of those with vacuum cleaners from 65% to 91%, of those with television sets from 34% to 87%, and of those with cars from 27% to 55%. In 1977, 69.1% of households had a car, 86% a washing machine, 93% a vacuum cleaner, 78% a food processor, 95% a television, 60% a cassette recorder, 89% a still camera and 93% a transistor radio, while in 1976 20% of households had a radio recorder, 60% a tape recorder, and 63% a record player.

=== Reparations ===
In addition to the physical barriers that had to be overcome for the West German economic recovery, there were also intellectual challenges. The Allies confiscated intellectual property of great value, all German patents, at home and abroad, and used them to strengthen their own industrial competitiveness by licensing them to Allied companies.

Immediately after the German surrender in May 1945, and for the next two years, the U.S. pursued a vigorous program of intellectual reparations through Operation Paperclip. John Gimbel's book Science Technology and Reparations: Exploitation and Plunder in Postwar Germany concludes that the "intellectual reparations" taken by the U.S. and the United Kingdom amounted to close to $10 billion. During the more than two years that this policy was in place, new industrial research in Germany was hampered because it was unprotected and freely available to overseas competitors, encouraged by occupation authorities to access all records and facilities.

=== Marshall Plan ===
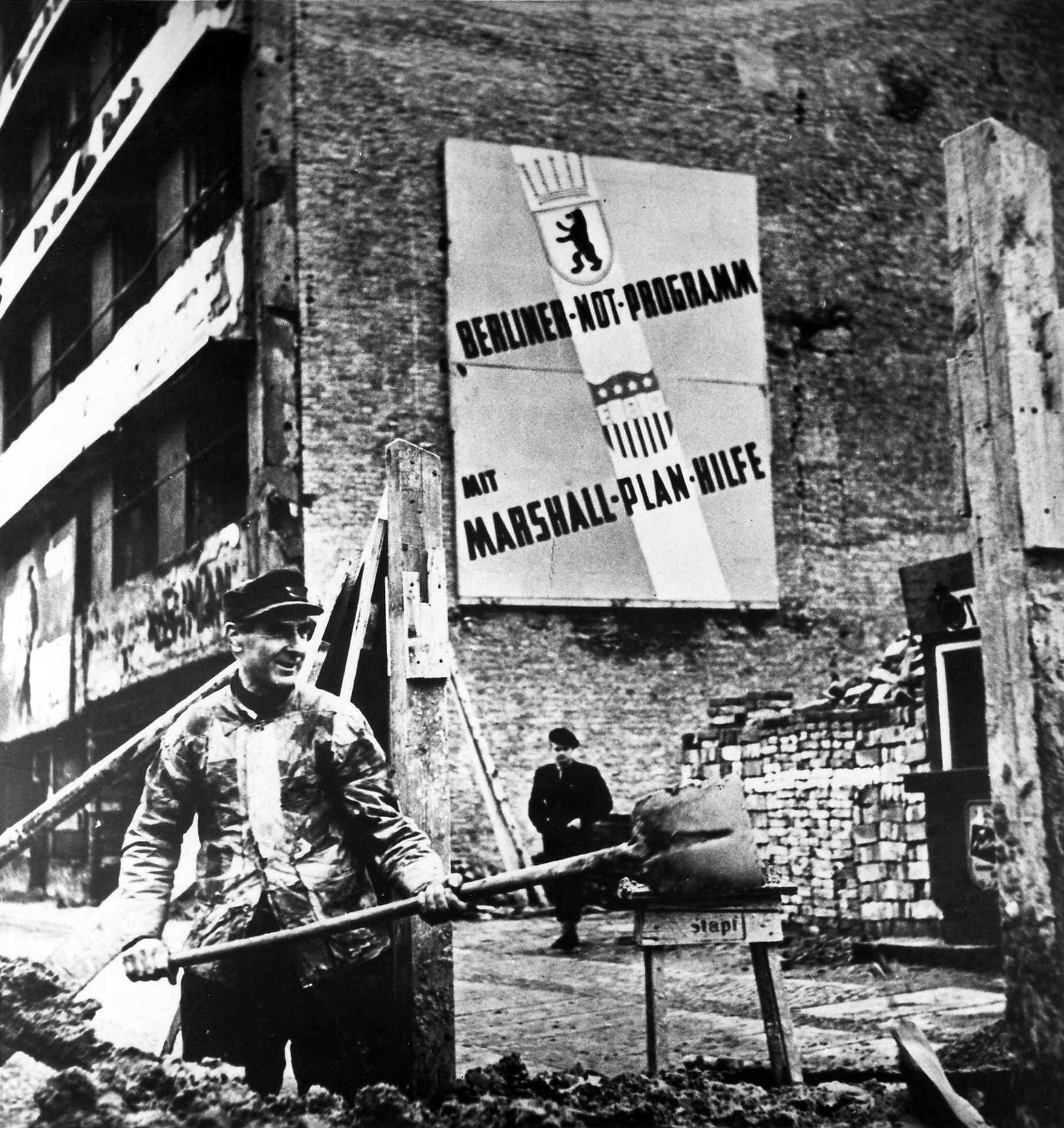
Builders in West Berlin working on a project funded with Marshall Aid, 1952

Thousands of the best German researchers and engineers worked in the Soviet Union and in the United States. The United States only extended the 1948–1952 Marshall Plan to Western Germany after it realised that the suppression of the West German economy was holding back the recovery of other European countries; the Marshall Plan was not the main force behind the Wirtschaftswunder. However, Marshall aid likely greatly contributed to Germany's overall economic recovery. Furthermore, often overlooked is the effect of the "unofficial contributions" of 150,000 U.S. occupation troops, earning as much as 4 Deutschmark to the dollar. These marks were spent within West Germany to buy food, luxury items, beer and cars, as well as entertaining the locals and for prostitutes. During exercises the number of such military personnel would swell to over 250,000. Nonetheless, the amount of monetary aid, which was mainly in the form of loans, about $1.4 billion, was greatly overshadowed by the amount the Germans had to pay back as war reparations and by the charges which the Allies imposed on the Germans for the ongoing cost of the occupation, about $2.4 billion per year. In 1953 it was decided that Germany would repay $1.1 billion of the aid it had received. The last repayment was made in June 1971.

The demands of the Korean War of 1950–1953 led to a global shortage of goods that helped overcome lingering resistance to the purchase of West German products. At the time West Germany had a large pool of skilled labour, partly as a result of the deportations and migrations of Germans, which involved up to 16.5 million people. This helped West Germany to more than double the value of its exports during and shortly after the war. Apart from these factors, hard work and long hours at full capacity among the population in the 1950s, 1960s and early 1970s – and, from the mid-1950s onward, extra labour supplied by thousands of foreign migrant Gastarbeiter ("guest workers") – provided a vital force sustaining the economic upturn. From the late 1950s, West Germany had one of the world's most powerful economies. The East German economy also showed strong growth; but not as much as in West Germany, due to the bureaucratic system, emigration of working-age East Germans to West Germany, and materiel sent as reparations to the USSR. Unemployment hit a record low of 0.7–0.8% in 1961–1966 and 1970–1971. Ludwig Erhard, who served as Minister of the Economy in Chancellor Adenauer's cabinet from 1949 until 1963 and later became Chancellor himself (1963–1966), is often associated with the West German Wirtschaftswunder.

== Austria ==
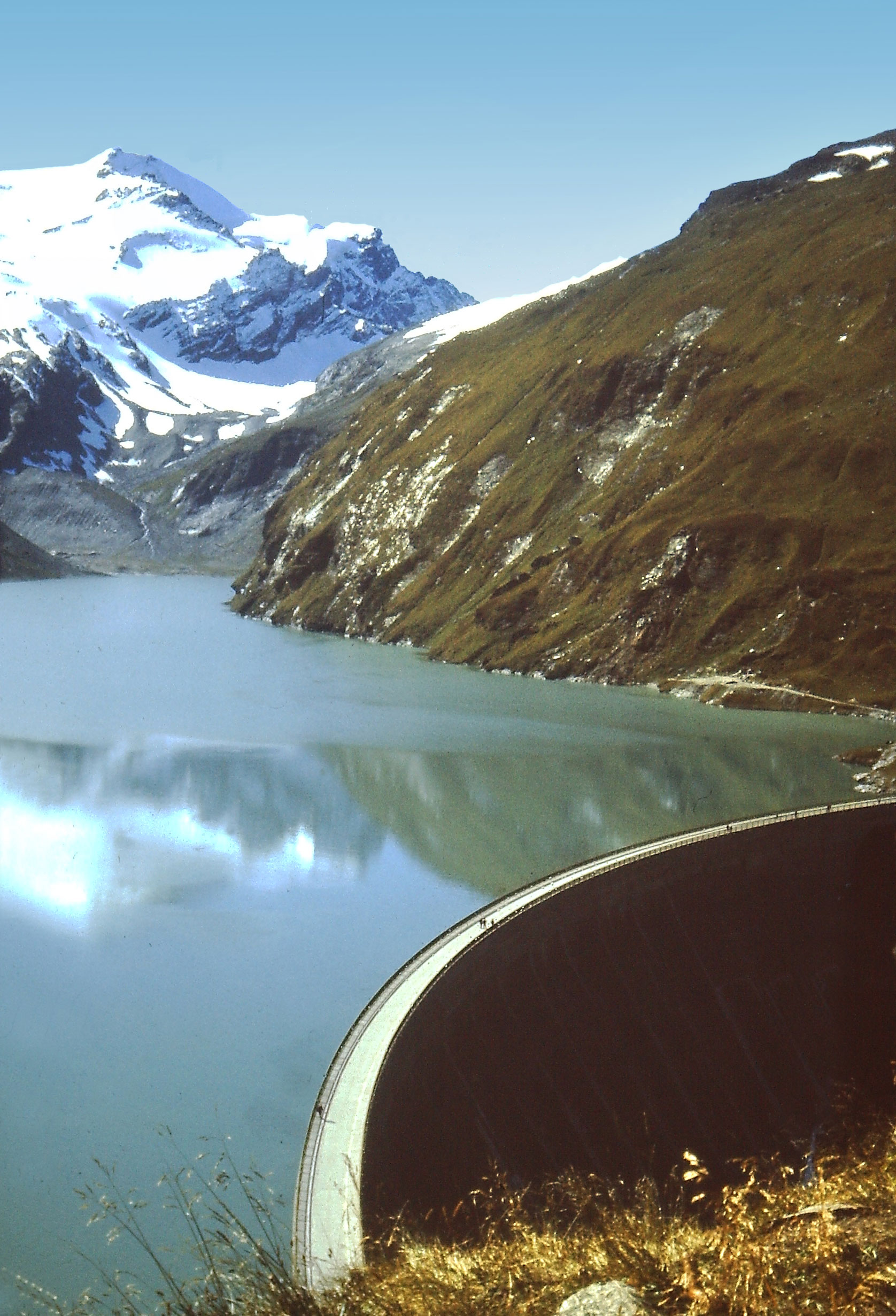
Mooserboden reservoir, Kaprun, 1968

Austria was also included in the Marshall Plan and can thus be included in any consideration of the Wirtschaftswunder. Through the nationalisation of key industries (VOEST, AMAG, Steyr-Puch) and yet more long working hours, full economic capacity was reached. Using West Germany as a guide, the currency was stabilised when the Schilling was reintroduced in place of the Reichsmark. This economic policy was known in journalistic circles as the Raab-Kamitz-Kurs, named after Julius Raab, Austrian chancellor from 1953, and his Finance Minister Reinhard Kamitz similar to the West German Adenauer-Erhard-Kurs.

Because of major state projects, such as the Kaprun hydroelectric plant and the West Autobahn, unemployment fell and social peace was ensured. In the 1950s the first Gastarbeiter from Southern Italy and Greece arrived in the country, as more manual labour was required to maintain the economic upswing.

== See also ==
- Economy of Germany
- GARIOA
- History of the Ruhr District
- Industrial plans for Germany
- Italian economic miracle
- Japanese economic miracle
- Marshall Plan
- Miracle on the Han River
- Morgenthau Plan
- Post-World War II boom
- Record years
- Spanish miracle
- Trente Glorieuses
