= Post–World War II economic expansion =

Long period of worldwide economic growth following World War II

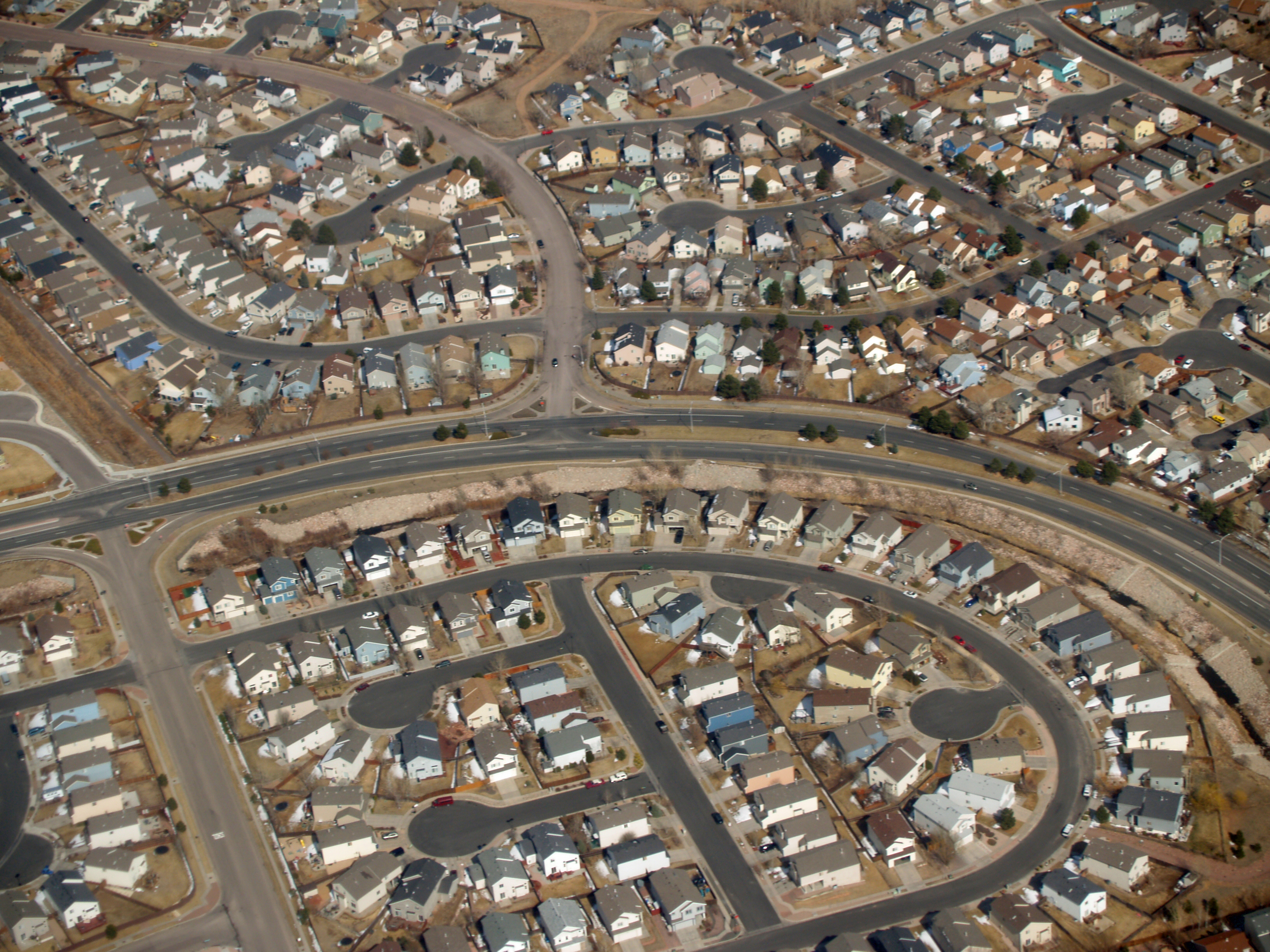
In the United States and several other nations, the post–World War II boom led to major suburban development and urban sprawl, aided by increasing automobile ownership and cheap oil, as shown in this suburban development in Colorado Springs, Colorado in March 2008.

Per capita GDP of various industrialized countries between 1920 and 1976

The post–World War II economic expansion, also known as the postwar economic boom or the Golden Age of Capitalism was a broad period of worldwide economic expansion beginning with the aftermath of World War II and ending with the 1973–1975 recession. The United States, the Soviet Union, Australia and Western European and East Asian countries in particular experienced unusually high and sustained growth, together with full employment.

Contrary to early predictions, this high growth also included many countries that had been devastated by the war, such as Japan (Japanese economic miracle), West Germany and Austria (Wirtschaftswunder), South Korea (Miracle on the Han River), Belgium (Belgian economic miracle), France (Trente Glorieuses), Italy (Italian economic miracle) and Greece (Greek economic miracle). Even countries that were relatively unaffected by the war such as Sweden (Record years) experienced considerable economic growth.

The boom established the conditions for a larger series of global changes at the height of the Cold War, including postmodernism, decolonisation, a marked increase in consumerism, the welfare state, the space race, the Non-Aligned Movement, import substitution, counterculture of the 1960s, the beginning of second-wave feminism, and a nuclear arms race.

== Timeline ==
In 2000, economist Roger Middleton wrote that economic historians generally agree that 1950 represented the beginning year of the golden age, while Robert Skidelsky states 1951 is the most recognized start date. Both Skidelsky and Middleton have 1973 as the generally recognized end date, though sometimes the golden age is considered to have ended as early as 1970.

This long-term business cycle ended with a number of events in the early 1970s:

- the collapse of the Bretton Woods monetary system in 1971
- the closing of the gold window by President Richard Nixon as a response to the Bretton Woods collapse
- the continued growth of international trade in manufactured goods, such as automobiles and electronics
- the 1973 oil crisis,
- the 1973–74 stock market crash, and
- the ensuing 1973–75 recession

While this is the global period, specific countries experienced business expansions for different periods; in Taiwan, the Taiwan Miracle lasted into the late 1990s, for instance, while in France the period is referred to as Trente Glorieuses (Glorious 30 [years]) and is considered to extend for the 30-year period from 1945 to 1975.

== Global economic climate ==
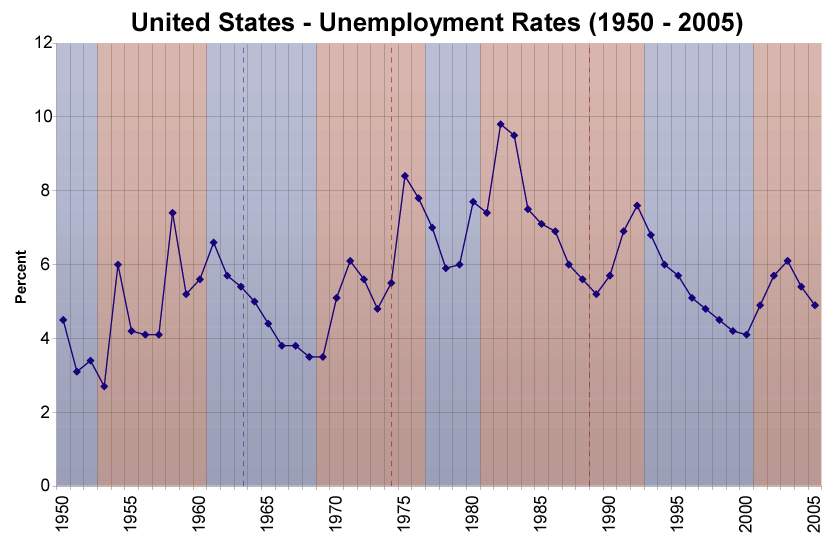
In the United States, unemployment fluctuated during the 1950s, but dropped steadily during the 1960s.

OECD members enjoyed real GDP growth averaging over 4% per year in the 1950s, and nearly 5% per year in the 1960s, compared with 3% in the 1970s and 2% in the 1980s.

Skidelsky devotes ten pages of his 2009 book Keynes: The Return of the Master to a comparison of the golden age to what he calls the Washington Consensus period, which he dates as spanning 1980–2009 (1973–1980 being a transitional period):

Metric	Golden Age	Washington Consensus
Average global growth	4.8%	3.2%
Unemployment (US)	4.8%	6.1%
Unemployment (France)	1.2%	9.5%
Unemployment (Germany)	3.1%	7.5%
Unemployment (Great Britain)	1.6%	7.4%

Skidelsky suggests the high global growth during the golden age was especially impressive as during that period Japan was the only major Asian economy enjoying high growth (Taiwan and South Korea at the time being small economies). It was not until later that the world had the exceptional growth of China raising the global average. Skidelsky also reports that inequality was generally decreasing during the golden age, whereas since the Washington Consensus was formed it has been increasing.

Globally, the golden age was a time of unusual financial stability, with crises far less frequent and intense than before or after. Martin Wolf reports that between 1945 and 1971 (27 years) the world saw only 38 financial crises, whereas from 1973 to 1997 (24 years) there were 139.

== Causes ==
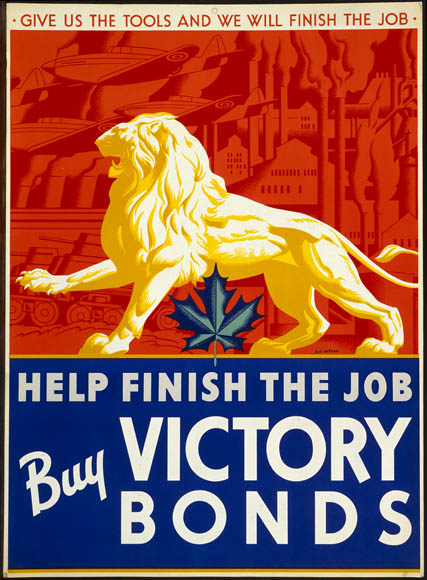
Allied war bonds matured during these years, transferring cash from governments to private households.

=== Productivity ===
High productivity growth from before the war continued after the war and until the early 1970s. Manufacturing was aided by automation technologies such as feedback controllers, which appeared in the late 1930s were a fast-growing area of investment following the war. Wholesale and retail trade benefited from new highway systems, distribution warehouses, and material handling equipment such as forklifts and intermodal containers. Oil displaced coal in many applications, particularly in locomotives and ships. In agriculture, the post WWII period saw the widespread introduction of the following:

- Chemical fertilizers
- Tractors
- Combine harvesters
- High-yielding variety
- Pesticides

=== Keynesian economics ===
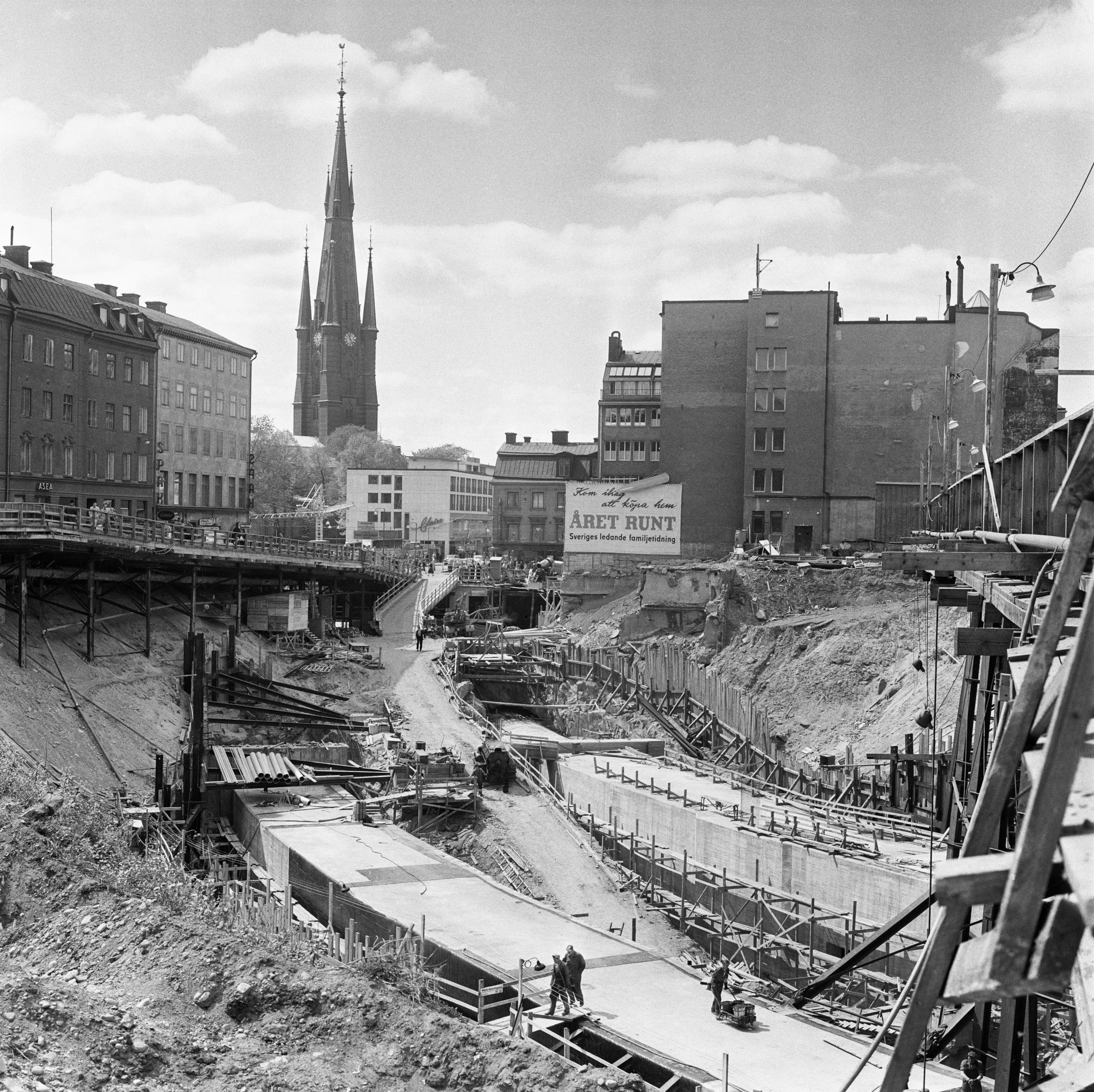
Many Western governments funded large infrastructure projects during this period. Here the redevelopment of Norrmalm and the Stockholm Metro, Sweden.

Keynesian economists argue that the post war expansion was caused by adoption of Keynesian economic policies. Naomi Klein has argued the high growth enjoyed by Europe and America was the result of Keynesian economic policies, and in the case of rapidly rising prosperity that this post war period saw in parts of South America, by the influence of developmentalist economics led by Raúl Prebisch.

==== Infrastructure spending ====
One of Eisenhower's enduring achievements was championing and signing the bill that authorized the Interstate Highway System in 1956. He justified the project through the Federal Aid Highway Act of 1956 as essential to American security during the Cold War. It was believed that large cities would be targets in a possible war, hence the highways were designed to facilitate their evacuation and ease military maneuvers.

==== Military spending ====
Another explanation for this period is the theory of the permanent war economy, which suggests that the large spending on the military helped stabilize the global economy; this has also been referred to as "Military Keynesianism". This also goes into hand with retired WWII vets with pensions to spend.

=== Financial repression ===
This period also saw financial repression—low nominal interest rates and low or negative real interest rates (nominal rates lower than inflation plus taxation), via government policy—resulting respectively in debt servicing costs being low (low nominal rates) and in liquidation of existing debt (via inflation and taxation). This allowed countries (such as the US and UK) to deal with their existing government debt level and also to reduce the level of debt without needing to direct a high portion of government spending to debt service.

=== Wealth redistribution ===
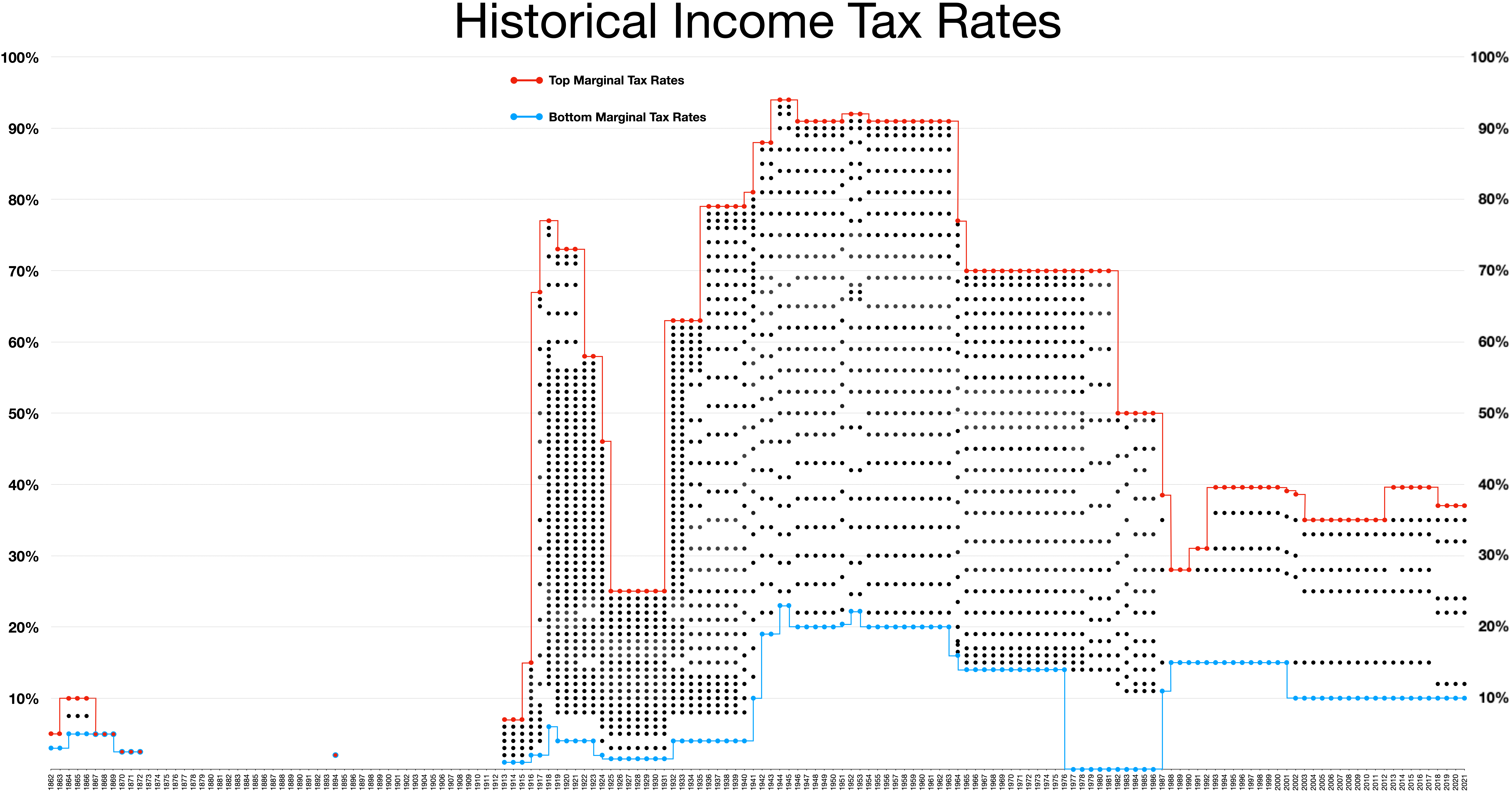
Top marginal income tax rates: Tax brackets; Lowest marginal income tax rates

Real income in the United States by percentile, normalized to 2007 costs. All social classes grew wealthier during the 1950s and 1960s, but the lower percentiles have only seen marginal improvement since then.

Much property was destroyed in war. In the inter-war period, the Great Depression also caused investments to lose value.

During both World Wars, progressive taxation and capital levies were introduced, with the generally-stated aim of distributing the sacrifices required by the war more evenly. While tax rates dipped between the wars, they did not return to pre-war levels. Top tax rates increased dramatically, in some cases tenfold. This had a significant effect on both income and wealth distributions. Such policies were commonly referred to as the "conscription of income" and "conscription of wealth".

a fundamental objection to the government's policy of conscription is that it conscripts human life only, and that it does not attempt to conscript wealth...

— Liberal party election platform, autumn 1917, Canada

The Economist, a British publication, opposed capital levies, but supported "direct taxation heavy enough to amount to rationing of citizens' incomes"; similarly, the American economist Oliver Mitchell Wentworth Sprague, in the Economic Journal, argued that that "conscription of men should logically and equitably be accompanied by something in the nature of conscription of current income above that which is absolutely necessary".

Rationing of goods was also widely used, with the aim of distributing scarce resources efficiently. Rationing was widely done with ration stamps, a second currency that entitled the bearer to buy (with regular money) a certain amount of a certain sort of good (for instance, two ounces of meat, or a certain amount of clothing or fuel). Price controls were also used (for instance, the price of restaurant meals was capped).

In the post-war period, progressive taxation persisted. Inheritance taxes also had an effect. Rationing in the United Kingdom lasted until 1954. Allied war bonds matured during the post-war years, transferring cash from governments to private households.

In Japan, progressive tax rates were imposed during the Allied occupation, at rates that roughly matched those in the United States at that time. High marginal tax rates for the wealthiest 1% were in place throughout Japan's decades of post-war growth. South Korea, after the Korean War, saw a similar trajectory. Marginal tax rates were high on the rich, until falling quickly in the 1990s. The state also legislated significant land reform, cutting deeply into a landholding elite's power and clientelism.

=== Low oil prices ===
The real oil price was low during the post-war decades, with this ending in the 1973 oil crisis.

In the 1940s, the price of oil was about $17, rising to just over $20 during the Korean War (1951–1953). During the Vietnam War (1950s–1970s) the price of oil slowly declined to under $20. During the Arab oil embargo of 1973—the first oil shock—the price of oil rapidly rose to double in price.

=== International cooperation ===
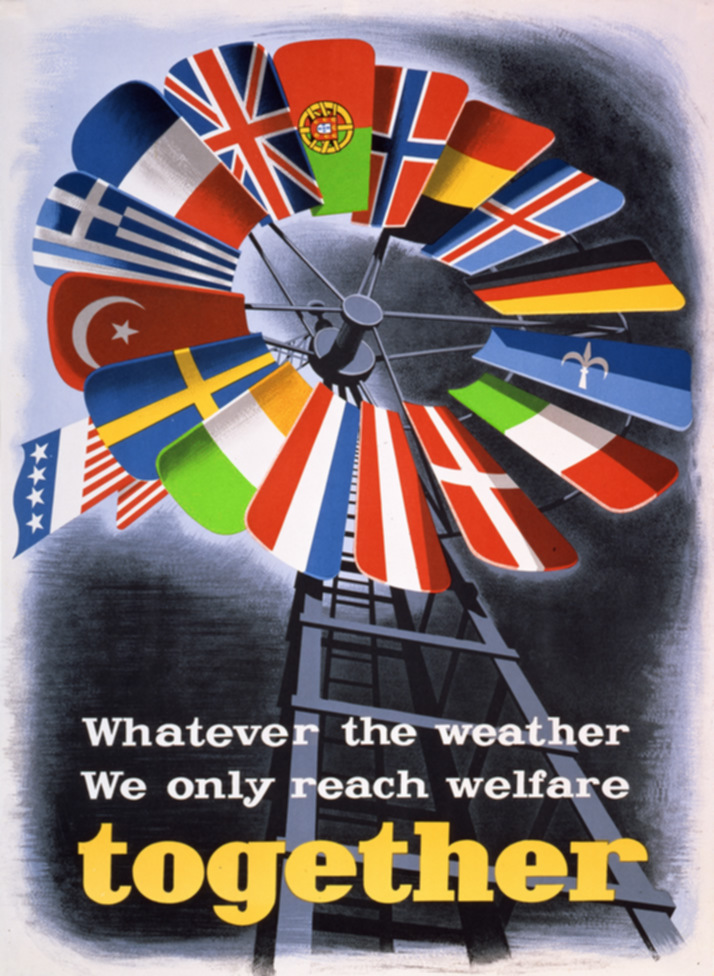
Poster for the Marshall Plan

Among the causes can be mentioned the rapid normalization of political relations between former Axis powers and the western Allies. After the war, the major powers were determined not to repeat the mistakes of the Great Depression, some of which were ascribed to post–World War I policy errors. The Marshall Plan for the rebuilding of Europe is most credited for reconciliation, though the immediate post-war situations was more complicated. In 1948 the Marshall Plan pumped over $12 billion to rebuild and modernize Western Europe. The European Coal and Steel Community formed the foundation of what was to become the European Union in later years.

==== Institutional arrangements ====
Institutional economists point to the international institutions established in the post-war period. Structurally, the victorious Allies established the United Nations and the Bretton Woods monetary system, international institutions designed to promote stability. This was achieved through a number of policies, including promoting free trade, instituting the Marshall Plan, and the use of Keynesian economics. Although this was before modern eastern countries growing their workforce I.e. before the outsourcing problem protectionists point to.

===== US Council of Economic Advisers =====
In the United States, the Employment Act of 1946 set the goals of achieving full employment, full production, and stable prices. It also created the Council of Economic Advisers to provide objective economic analysis and advice on the development and implementation of a wide range of domestic and international economic policy issues. In its first 7 years the CEA made five technical advances in policy making:

1. The replacement of a "cyclical model" of the economy by a "growth model",
2. The setting of quantitative targets for the economy,
3. Use of the theories of fiscal drag and full-employment budget,
4. Recognition of the need for greater flexibility in taxation, and
5. Replacement of the notion of unemployment as a structural problem by a realization of low aggregate demand.

== Specific countries ==
The economies of the United States, Japan, West Germany, France, and Italy did particularly well. Japan and West Germany caught up to and exceeded the GDP of the United Kingdom during these years, even as the UK itself was experiencing the greatest absolute prosperity in its history. In France, this period is often looked back to with nostalgia as the Trente Glorieuses, or "Glorious Thirty", while the economies of West Germany and Austria were characterized by Wirtschaftswunder (economic miracle), and in Italy it is called Miracolo economico (economic miracle). Most developing countries also did well in this period.

=== Belgium ===
Belgium experienced a brief but very rapid economic recovery in the aftermath of World War II. The comparatively light damage sustained by Belgium's heavy industry during the German occupation and the Europe-wide need for the country's traditional exports (steel and coal, textiles, and railway infrastructure) meant that Belgium became the first European country to regain its pre-war level of output in 1947. Economic growth in the period was accompanied by low inflation and sharp increases in real living standards.

However, lack of capital investment meant that Belgium's heavy industry was ill-equipped to compete with other European industries in the 1950s. This contributed to the start of deindustrialisation in Wallonia and the emergence of regional economic disparities.

=== France ===
Between 1947 and 1973, France went through a boom period (5% growth per year on average) dubbed by Jean Fourastié Trente Glorieuses – the title of a book published in 1979. The economic growth occurred mainly due to productivity gains and to an increase in the number of working hours. Indeed, the working population grew very slowly, the "baby boom" being offset by the extension of the time dedicated to study. Productivity gains came from catching up with the United States. In 1950, the average income in France was 55% of that of an American; it reached 80% in 1973. Among the "major" nations, only Japan had faster growth in this era than France.

The extended period of transformation and modernization also involved an increasing internationalization of the French economy. France by the 1980s had become a leading world economic power and the world's fourth-largest exporter of manufactured products. It became Europe's largest agricultural producer and exporter, accounting for more than 10 percent of world trade in such goods by the 1980s. The service sector grew rapidly and became the largest sector, generating a large foreign-trade surplus, chiefly from the earnings from tourism.

=== Italy ===
The Italian economy experienced very variable growth. In the 1950s and early 1960s the Italian economy boomed, with record high growth-rates, including 6.4% in 1959, 5.8% in 1960, 6.8% in 1961, and 6.1% in 1962. This rapid and sustained growth was due to the ambitions of several Italian businesspeople, the opening of new industries (helped by the discovery of hydrocarbons, made for iron and steel, in the Po Valley), re-construction and the modernisation of most Italian cities, such as Milan, Rome and Turin, and the aid given to the country after World War II (notably through the Marshall Plan).

=== Japan ===
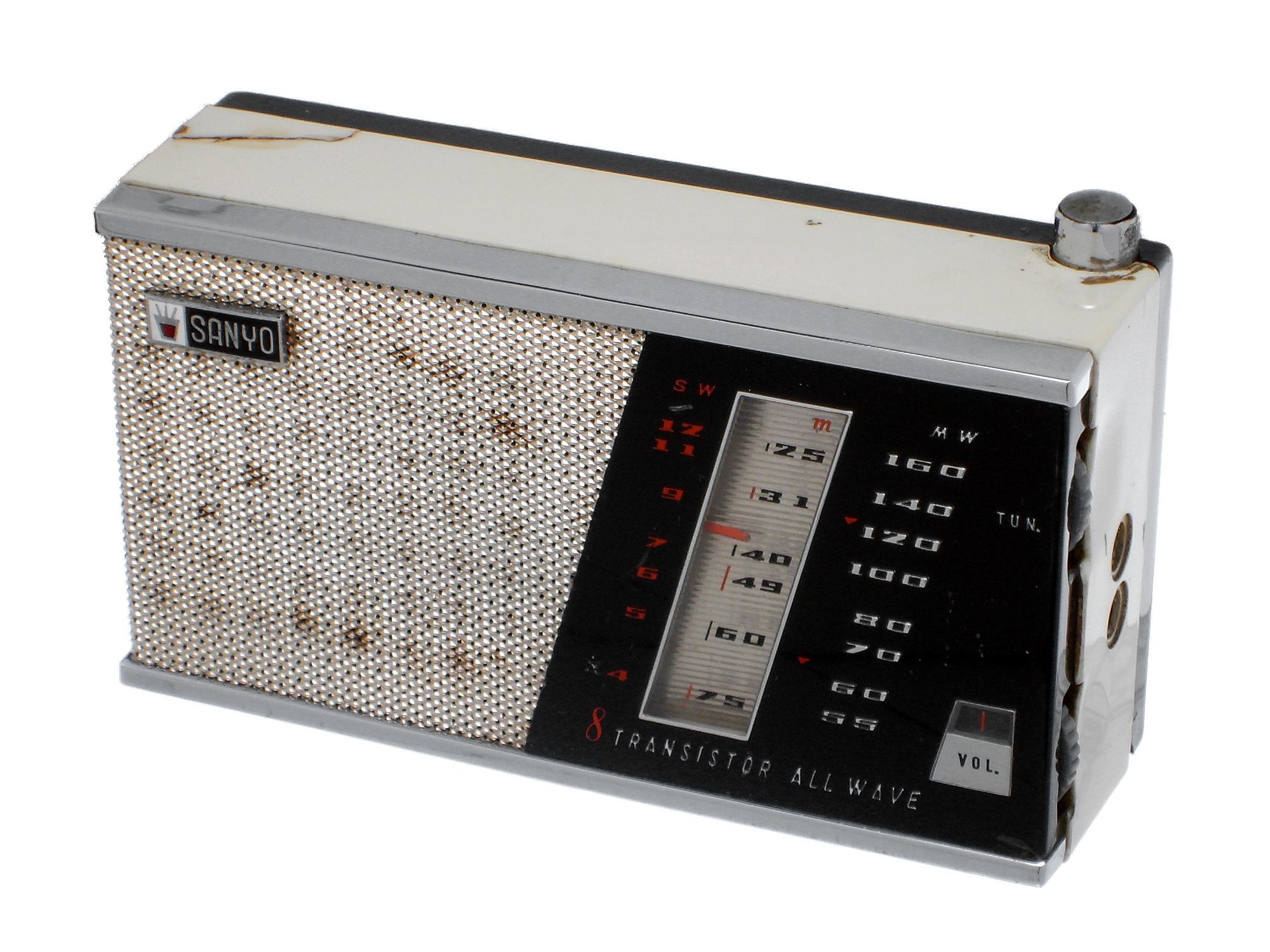
A transistor radio made by Sanyo in 1959. Japan manufactured much of the world's consumer electronics during this period.

After 1950 Japan's economy recovered from the war damage and began to boom, with the fastest growth rates in the world. Given a boost by the Korean War, in which it acted as a major supplier to the UN force, Japan's economy embarked on a prolonged period of extremely rapid growth, led by the manufacturing sectors. Japan emerged as a significant power in many economic spheres, including steel working, car manufacturing and the manufacturing of electronics. Japan rapidly caught up with the West in foreign trade, GNP, and general quality of life. The high economic growth and political tranquility of the mid to late 1960s were slowed by the quadrupling of oil prices in 1973. Almost completely dependent on imports for petroleum, Japan experienced its first recession since World War II. Another serious problem was Japan's growing trade surplus, which reached record heights. The United States pressured Japan to remedy the imbalance, demanding that Tokyo raise the value of the yen and open its markets further to facilitate more imports from the United States.

=== Soviet Union ===
In early 1950s, the Soviet Union, having reconstructed the ruins left by the war, experienced a decade of prosperous, undisturbed, and rapid economic growth, with significant and remarkable technological achievements most notably the first earth satellite. The nation made it to the top 15 countries with highest GDP per capita in the mid-1950s. However, the growth slowed by the mid-1960s, as the government started pouring resources into large military and space projects, and the civilian sector gradually languished. While every other major nation greatly expanded its service sector, in the Soviet Union it was given low priority. Following Khrushchev's ouster, and the appointment of a collective leadership led by Leonid Brezhnev and Alexei Kosygin, the economy was revitalised. The economy continued to grow apace during the late 1960s, during the Eighth Five-Year Plan. However, economic growth began to falter during the late 1970s, beginning the Era of Stagnation.

=== Sweden ===
Sweden emerged almost unharmed from World War II, and experienced tremendous economic growth until the early 1970s, as Social Democratic Prime Minister Tage Erlander held his office from 1946 to 1969. Sweden used to be a country of emigrants until the 1930s, but the demand for labor spurred immigration to Sweden, especially from Finland and countries like Greece, Italy and Yugoslavia. Urbanization was fast, and housing shortage in urban areas was imminent until the Million Programme was launched in the 1960s.

=== United Kingdom ===
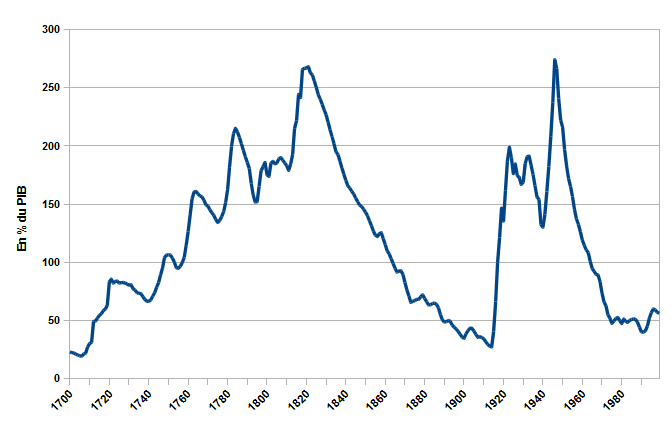
The national debt of the United Kingdom was at a record high percentage of the GDP as the war ended, but was largely repaid by 1975.

A 1957 speech by UK Prime Minister Harold Macmillan captures what the golden age felt like, even before the brightest years which were to come in the 1960s.

Let us be frank about it: most of our people have never had it so good. Go round the country, go to the industrial towns, go to the farms and you will see a state of prosperity such as we have never had in my lifetime – nor indeed in the history of this country.

Unemployment figures show that unemployment was significantly lower during the Golden Age than before or after:

Epoch	Date range	Percentage of British labour force unemployed.
Pre-Golden Age	1921–1938	13.4
Golden Age	1950–1969	1.6
Post-Golden Age	1970–1993	6.7

In addition to superior economic performance, other social indexes were higher in the golden age; for example the proportion of Britain's population saying they were "very happy" fell from 52% in 1957 to just 36% in 2005.

=== United States ===
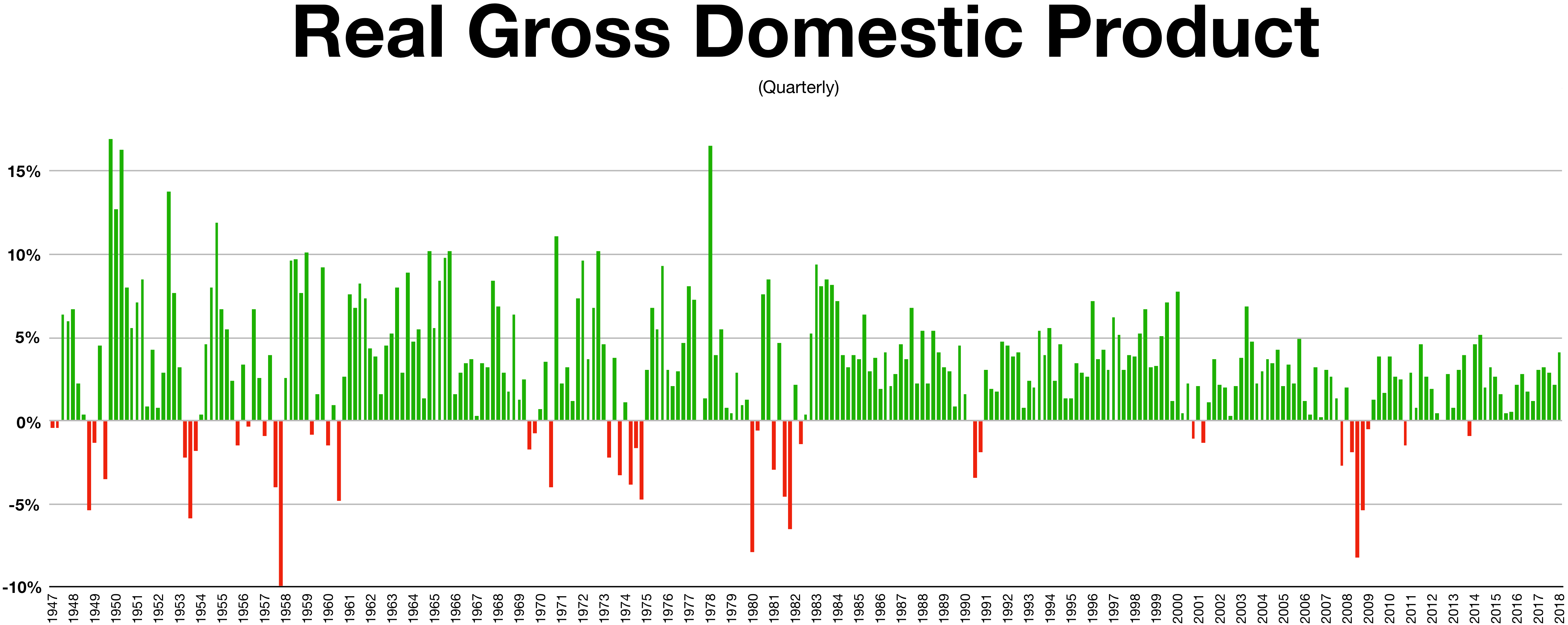
Quarterly gross domestic product

The period from the end of World War II to the early 1970s was one of the greatest eras of economic expansion in world history. In the US, Gross Domestic Product increased from $228 billion in 1945 to just under $1.7 trillion in 1975. By 1975, the US economy represented some 35% of the entire world industrial output, and the US economy was over 3 times larger than that of Japan, the next largest economy. The expansion was interrupted in the United States by five recessions (1948–49, 1953–54, 1957–58, 1960–61, and 1969–70).

$200 billion in war bonds matured, and the G.I. Bill financed a well-educated work force. The middle class swelled, as did GDP and productivity. The US underwent its own golden age of economic growth. This growth was distributed fairly evenly across the economic classes, which some attribute to the strength of labor unions in this period—labor union membership peaked during the 1950s. Much of the growth came from the movement of low-income farm workers into better-paying jobs in the towns and cities—a process largely completed by 1960.

=== West Germany ===
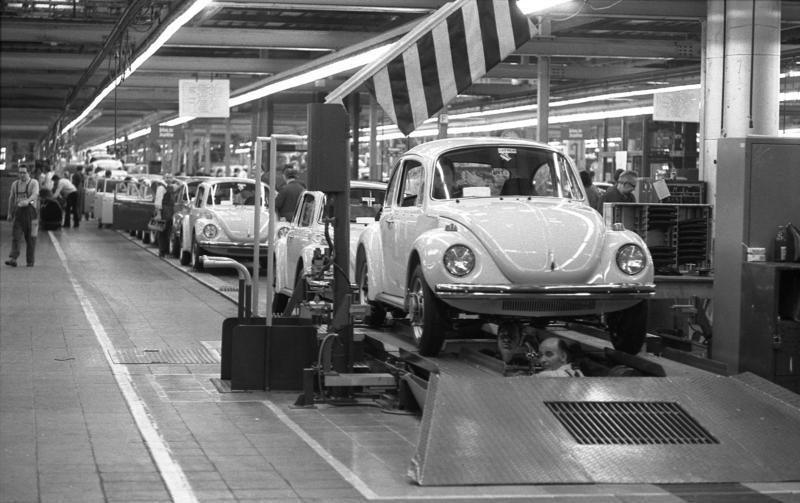
Assembly of the Volkswagen Beetle in West Germany

West Germany, under Chancellor Konrad Adenauer and economic minister Ludwig Erhard, saw prolonged economic growth beginning in the early 1950s. Journalists dubbed it the Wirtschaftswunder or "Economic Miracle". Industrial production doubled from 1950 to 1957, and gross national product grew at a rate of 9 or 10% per year, providing the engine for economic growth of all of Western Europe. Labor unions' support of the new policies, postponed wage increases, minimized strikes, supported technological modernization, and a policy of co-determination (Mitbestimmung), which involved a satisfactory grievance resolution system and required the representation of workers on the boards of large corporations, all contributed to such a prolonged economic growth. The recovery was accelerated by the currency reform of June 1948, US gifts of $1.4 billion Marshall Plan aid, the breaking down of old trade barriers and traditional practices, and the opening of the global market. West Germany gained legitimacy and respect, as it shed the horrible reputation Germany had gained under the Nazis. West Germany played a central role in the creation of European cooperation; it joined NATO in 1955 and was a founding member of the European Economic Community in 1958.

== Effects ==
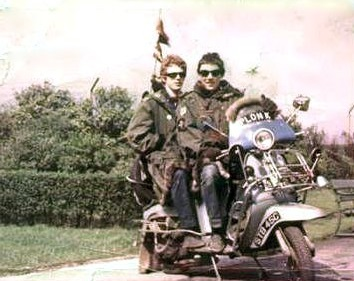
The increased free time of adolescents caused the rise of youth subcultures such as Mods.

The post-war economic boom had many social, cultural, and political effects (not least of which was the demographic bulge termed the baby boom). Movements and phenomena associated with this period include the height of the Cold War, postmodernism, decolonisation, a marked increase in consumerism, the welfare state, the space race, the Non-Aligned Movement, import substitution, counterculture of the 1960s, opposition to the Vietnam War, the civil rights movement, the sexual revolution, the beginning of second-wave feminism, and a nuclear arms race. In the United States, the middle-class began a mass migration away from the cities and towards the suburbs; it was a period of prosperity in which most people could enjoy a job for life, a house, and a family.

In the West, there emerged a near-complete consensus against strong ideology and a belief that technocratic and scientific solutions could be found to most of humanity's problems, a view advanced by US President John F. Kennedy in 1962. This optimism was symbolized through such events as the 1964 New York World's Fair, and Lyndon B. Johnson's Great Society programs, which aimed at eliminating poverty in the United States.

== Decline ==
The sharp rise in oil prices due to the 1973 oil crisis hastened the transition to the post-industrial economy, and a multitude of social problems have since emerged. During the 1970s steel crisis, demand for steel declined, and the Western world faced competition from newly industrialized countries. This was especially harsh for mining and steel districts such as the North American Rust Belt and the West German Ruhr area.

== GDP growth rates ==
GDP (PPP) growth rates in 1990 Int$ between 1950 and 1973 estimated by Angus Maddison
	Country	GDP growth
1	Austria	5.35
2	Belgium	4.08
3	Denmark	3.81
4	Finland	4.94
5	France	5.05
6	Germany	5.68
7	Italy	5.64
8	Japan	9.29
9	Netherlands	4.74
10	Norway	4.06
11	Portugal	5.73
12	Soviet Union	4.84
13	Spain	6.60
14	Sweden	3.73
15	Switzerland	4.51
16	United Kingdom	2.93
17	United States	3.93

== See also ==
- Four Asian Tigers – Economies of South Korea, Taiwan, Singapore and Hong Kong
- Great acceleration – Proposed geologic epoch
- Mexican miracle – Term for Mexico's economic growth, 1954–1970
- Nixon shock – 1971 decoupling of the US dollar from gold
- Post-war consensus – Period in British political history, 1945 to 1970s
- Spanish miracle – Economic boom in Spain 1959–1974
