= Italian economic miracle =

Italian historical period of economic growth (post-World War II–late 1960s)

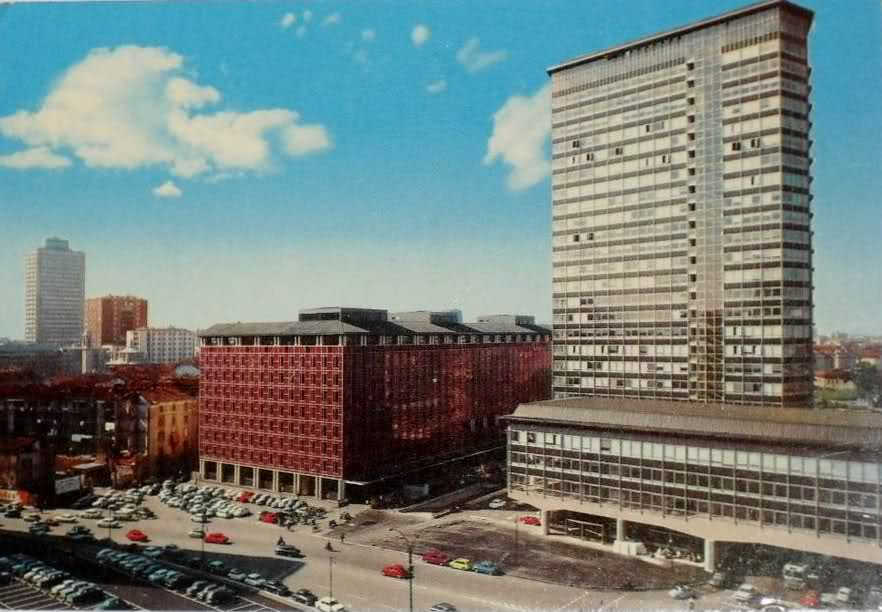
Downtown Milan in the 1960s

The Italian economic miracle (Italian: miracolo economico italiano), or the Italian economic boom (Italian: boom economico italiano), is the term used by historians, economists, and the mass media, first attributed by the Daily Mail in a correspondence from Rome on 25 May 1959, to designate the prolonged period of strong economic growth in Italy after World War II to the late 1960s, and in particular the years from 1958 to 1963.

This phase of Italian history represented not only a cornerstone in the economic and social development of the country—which was transformed from a poor, mainly rural, nation into a global industrial power—but also a period of momentous change in Italian society and culture. As summed up by one historian, by the end of the 1970s, "social security coverage had been made comprehensive and relatively generous. The material standard of living had vastly improved for the great majority of the population."

== History ==
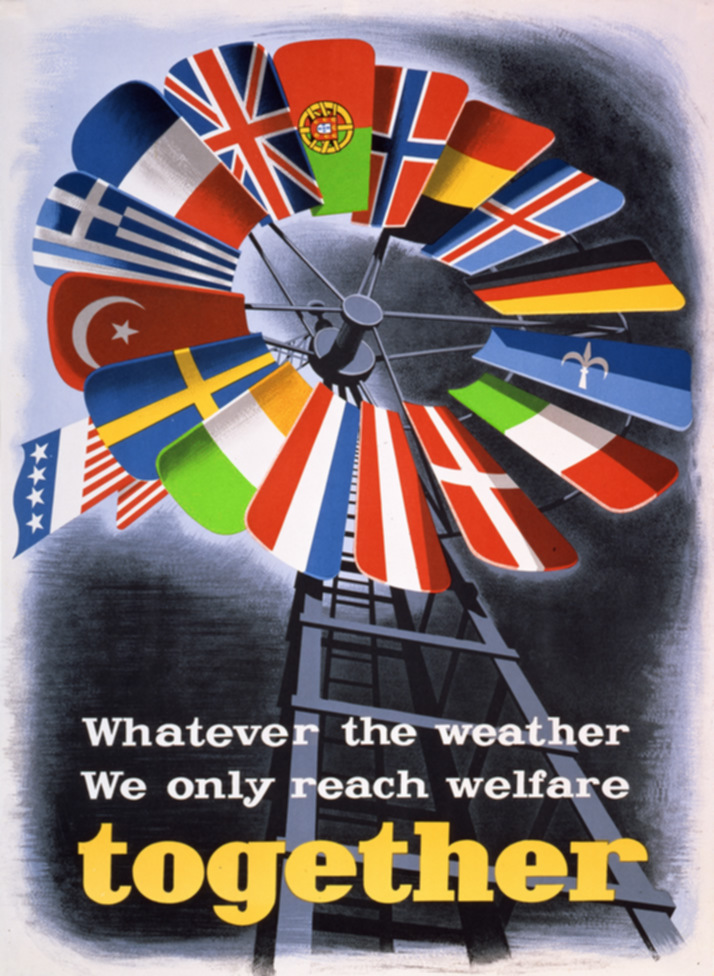
One of a number of posters created to promote the Marshall Plan in Europe

After the end of World War II, Italy was in ruins and occupied by foreign armies, a condition that worsened the chronic development gap towards the more advanced European economies; however, the new geopolitical logic of the Cold War made possible that the former enemy Italy, a hinge-country between Western Europe and the Mediterranean, and now a new, fragile democracy threatened by the proximity of the Iron Curtain and the presence of the Italian Communist Party (PCI), a strong Communist party in Western Europe, was considered by the United States as an important ally for the "Free World", and therefore a recipient of the generous aid provided by the Marshall Plan, receiving $1.5 billion from 1948 to 1952. The end of the plan, which could have stopped the recovery, coincided with the crucial point of the Korean War (1950–1953), whose demand for metal and other manufactured products was a further stimulus to the growth of every kind of industry in Italy. In addition, the creation in 1957 of the European Common Market, of which Italy was among the founder members, provided more investments and eased exports.

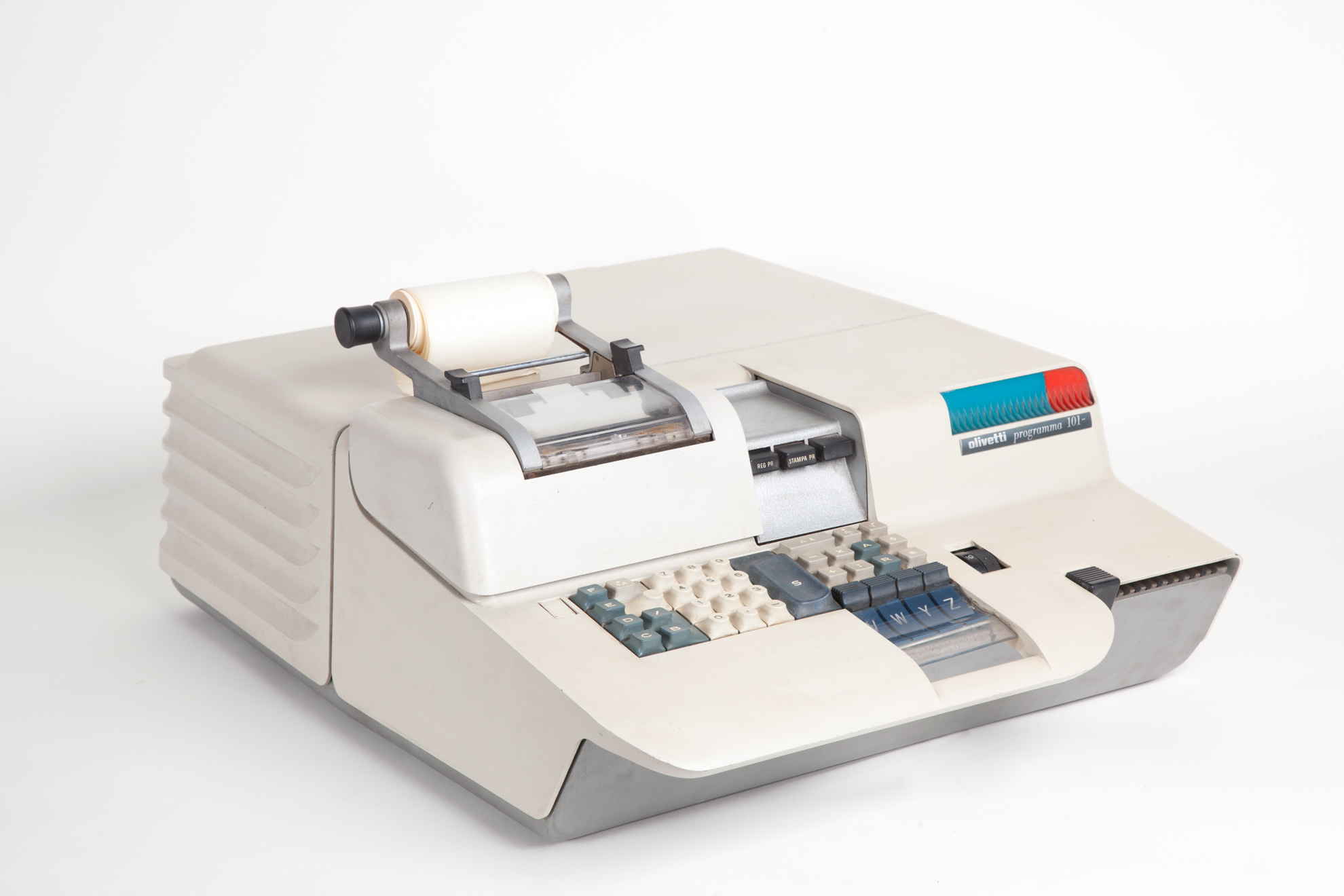
Programma 101, developed in 1965 by Olivetti, is considered one of the first programmable calculators ever and was an economic success internationally.

These highly favourable historical backgrounds, combined with the presence of a large and cheap stock of labour force, laid the foundations of a spectacular economic growth. The boom lasted almost uninterrupted until the Hot Autumn and its massive strikes and social unrest of 1969–1970. Combined with the later 1973 oil crisis, the unrest gradually cooled the economy, which never returned to its heady post-war growth rates. The Italian economy experienced an average rate of growth of GDP of 5.8% per year between 1951 and 1963, and 5.0% per year between 1964 and 1973. Italian rates of growth were second only but very close to the West German rates in Europe, and among the OEEC countries only Japan had been doing better. On 1 July 1963, US President John F. Kennedy personally praised Italy's extraordinary economic growth at an official dinner with Italian President Antonio Segni in Rome, stating that the growth of the nation's "economy, industry, and living standards in the postwar years" had been "truly been phenomenal". He added, "A nation once literally in ruins, beset by heavy unemployment and inflation, has expanded its output and assets, stabilized its costs and currency, and created new jobs and new industries at a rate unmatched in the Western world."

== Society and culture ==
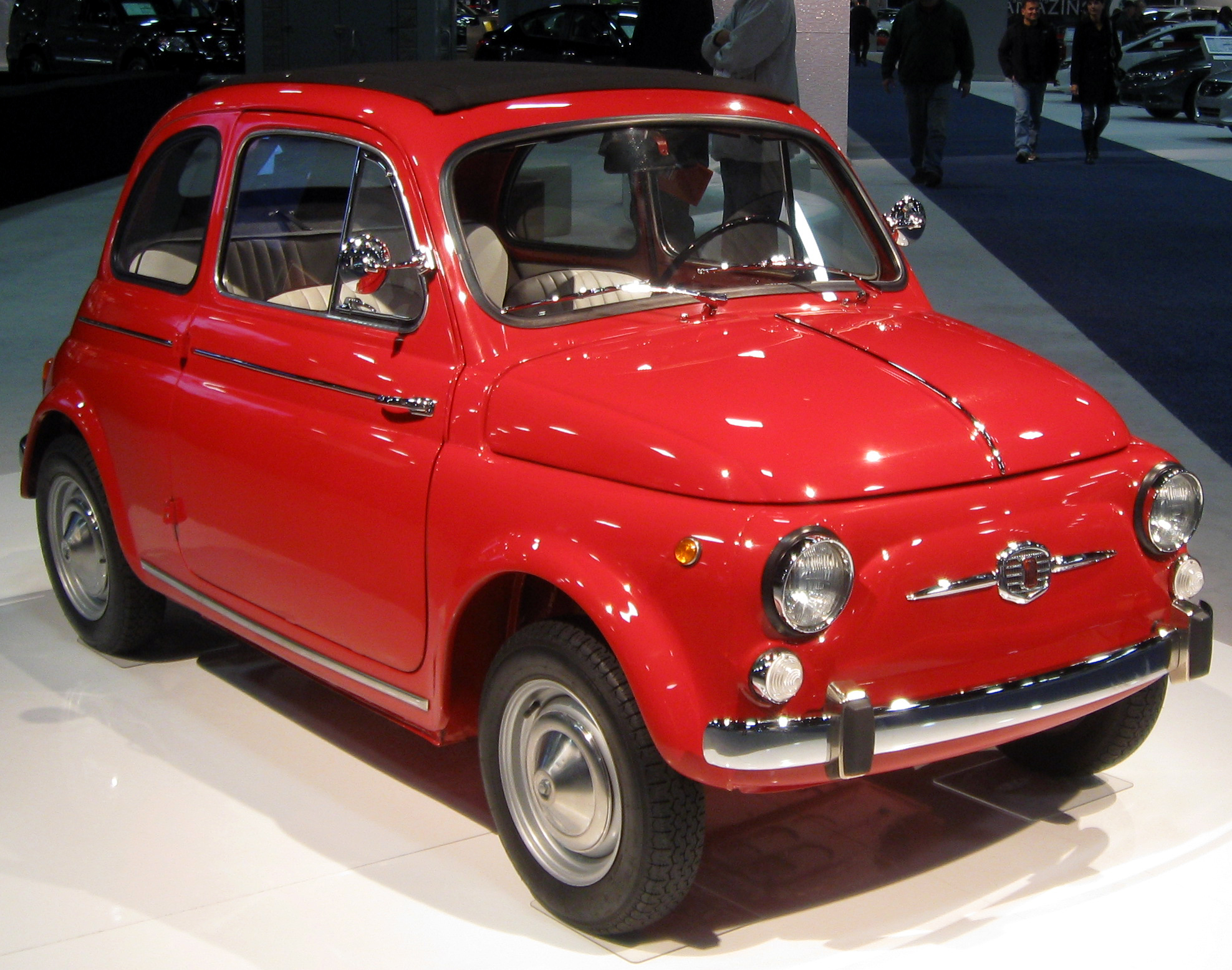
The Fiat 500, launched in 1957, is considered a symbol of Italy's economic miracle.

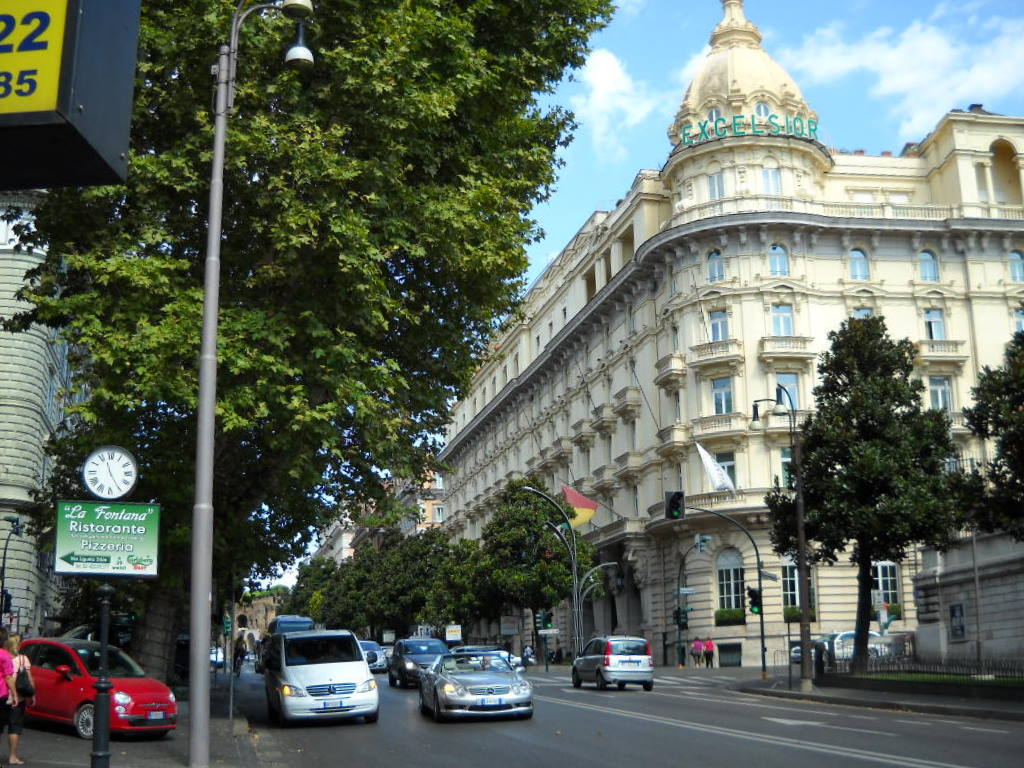
The elegant Via Veneto in Rome, street symbol of La Dolce Vita, the film that represented the hyperactive lifestyle of Italy in those years.

The impact of the economic miracle on Italian society was huge. Fast economic expansion induced massive inflows of migrants from rural Southern Italy to the industrial cities of the North. Emigration was especially directed to the factories of the "industrial triangle", the region placed between the major manufacturing centres of Milan and Turin and the seaport of Genoa. Between 1955 and 1971, around 9 million people are estimated to have been involved in inter-regional migrations in Italy, uprooting entire communities and creating large metropolitan areas.

The needs of a modernizing economy and society created a great demand for new transport and energy infrastructures. Thousands of miles of railways and highways were completed in record times to connect the main urban areas, while dams and power plants were built all over Italy, often without regard for geological and environmental conditions. A concurrent boom of the real estate market, increasingly under pressure by strong demographic growth and internal migrations, led to the explosion of urban areas. Vast neighborhoods of low-income apartments and social housing were built in the outskirts of many cities, leading over the years to severe problems of congestion, urban decay, and street violence. The natural environment was constantly under strain by unregulated industrial expansion, leading to widespread air and water pollution and ecological disasters, such as the Vajont Dam disaster and the Seveso chemical accident, until a green consciousness developed starting in the 1980s.

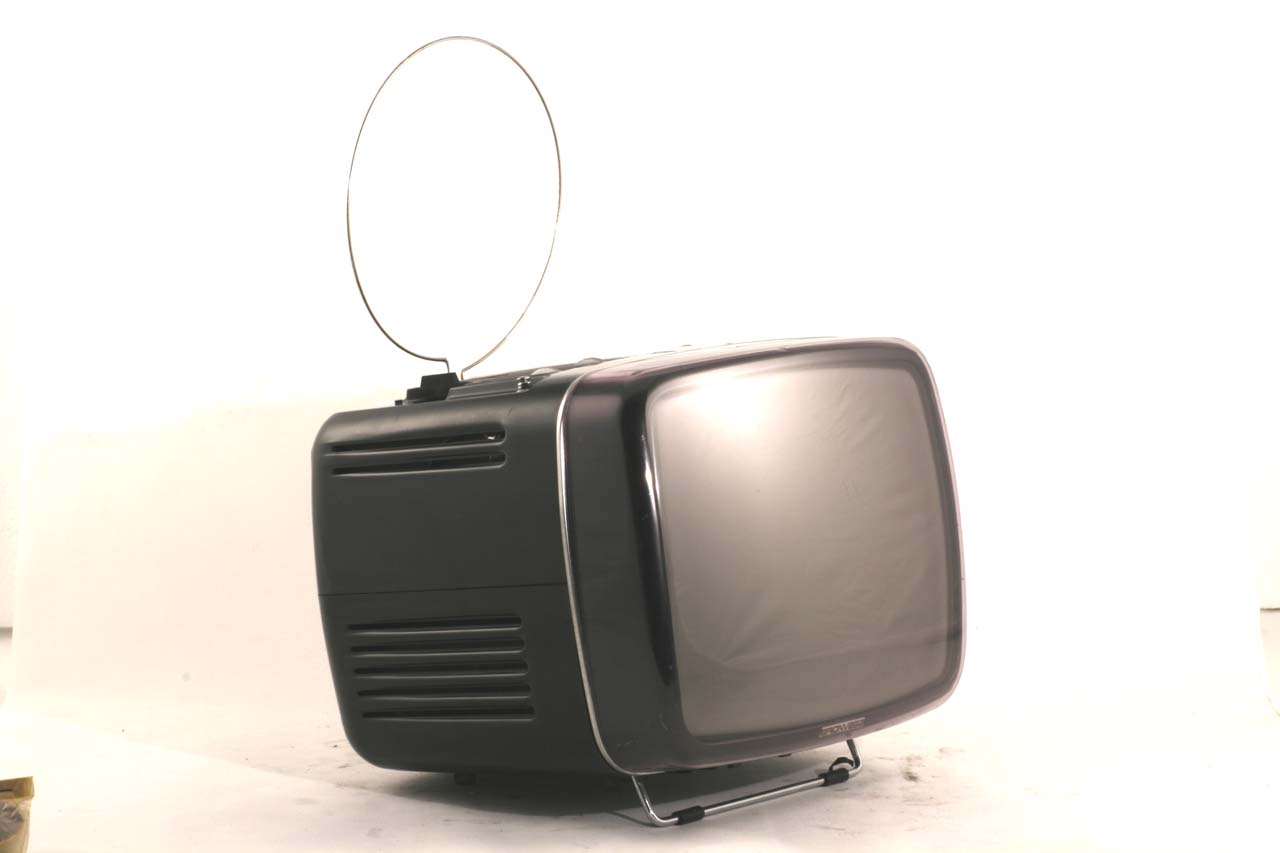
Brionvega launched the first Italian-made television set in 1954, and the first European-made portable TV in 1962.

On 3 January 1954, the national public broadcasting RAI began a regular television service. At the same time, the doubling of Italian GDP, between 1950 and 1962, had a massive impact on society and culture. Italian society, largely rural and excluded from the benefits of modern economy during the first half of the century, was suddenly flooded with a huge variety of cheap consumer goods, such as automobiles, televisions, and washing machines. From 1951 to 1971, average per capita income in real terms trebled, a trend accompanied by significant improvements in consumption patterns and living conditions. In 1955, only 3% of households owned refrigerators and 1% washing machines, while by 1975 the respective figures were 94% and 76%. In addition, 66% of all homes had come to possess cars.

The rapid expansion of the automotive industry, spearheaded by the Turin-based manufacturer Fiat, where many Southern Italians had migrated to in a process started in the 1930s, was complement of Italy's dynamic and modern capitalism. Moreover, Turin—a city described as "the Detroit of Italy" since 1945—served as the industrial capital of this growth, with the automotive manufacturer Fiat becoming the primary locomotive of the Italian economy and a symbol of its modern and efficient capitalism, as well as an international industrial giant. The scale of this transformation was reflected in domestic vehicle sales, which climbed rapidly from 100,000 units in 1950 to 230,000 in 1955 and 877,000 in 1962, and ultimately surpassed one million by 1963. This international corporate and domestic economic growth found its sporting and social reflection in the Agnelli family's football club Juventus, which also closely acted as a mirror reflection of the country's history, including the economic miracle and the Hot Autumn; the team's contemporary athletic triumphs, high-profile stars, and sophisticated public image—promoted and celebrated as stile Juve (Juve style)—operated as the perfect cultural and worldly complement to Italy's rampant economic boom.

== Criticism ==
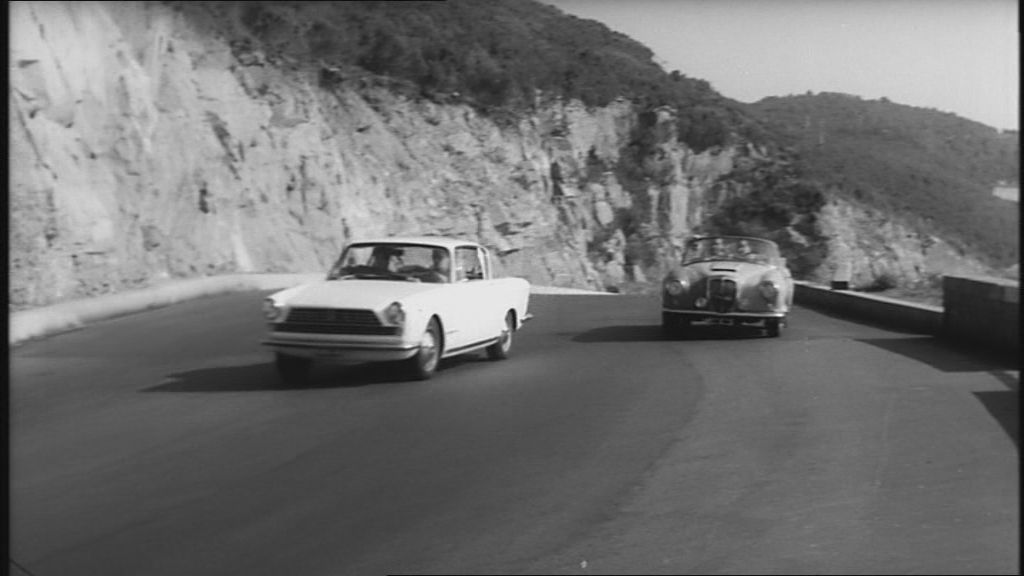
Scene from the film Il Sorpasso by Dino Risi which prominently features a 1958 Lancia Aurelia B24 cabriolet (1962)

The Italian economic miracle exerted a mixture of fascination and aversion. The pervasive influence of the mass media and consumerism on society in Italy was often fiercely criticized by contemporary intellectuals like Pier Paolo Pasolini and Luciano Bianciardi, who denounced it as a sneaky form of homogenization and cultural decay. Popular movies like Il Sorpasso (1962) and I Mostri (1963) by Dino Risi, Il Boom (1963) by Vittorio De Sica, and C'eravamo tanto amati (1974) by Ettore Scola all stigmatized selfishness and immorality that they believed characterized the miracle's roaring years.

== See also ==
- Economic history of Italy
- Economic miracle
- Istituto per la Ricostruzione Industriale
- Japanese economic miracle
- La Dolce Vita (1960)
- Post–World War II economic expansion
- Spanish miracle
- Wirtschaftswunder
- Years of Lead, the period of unrest following the Italian economic miracle
