= Spanish miracle =

Economic boom in Spain 1959–1974

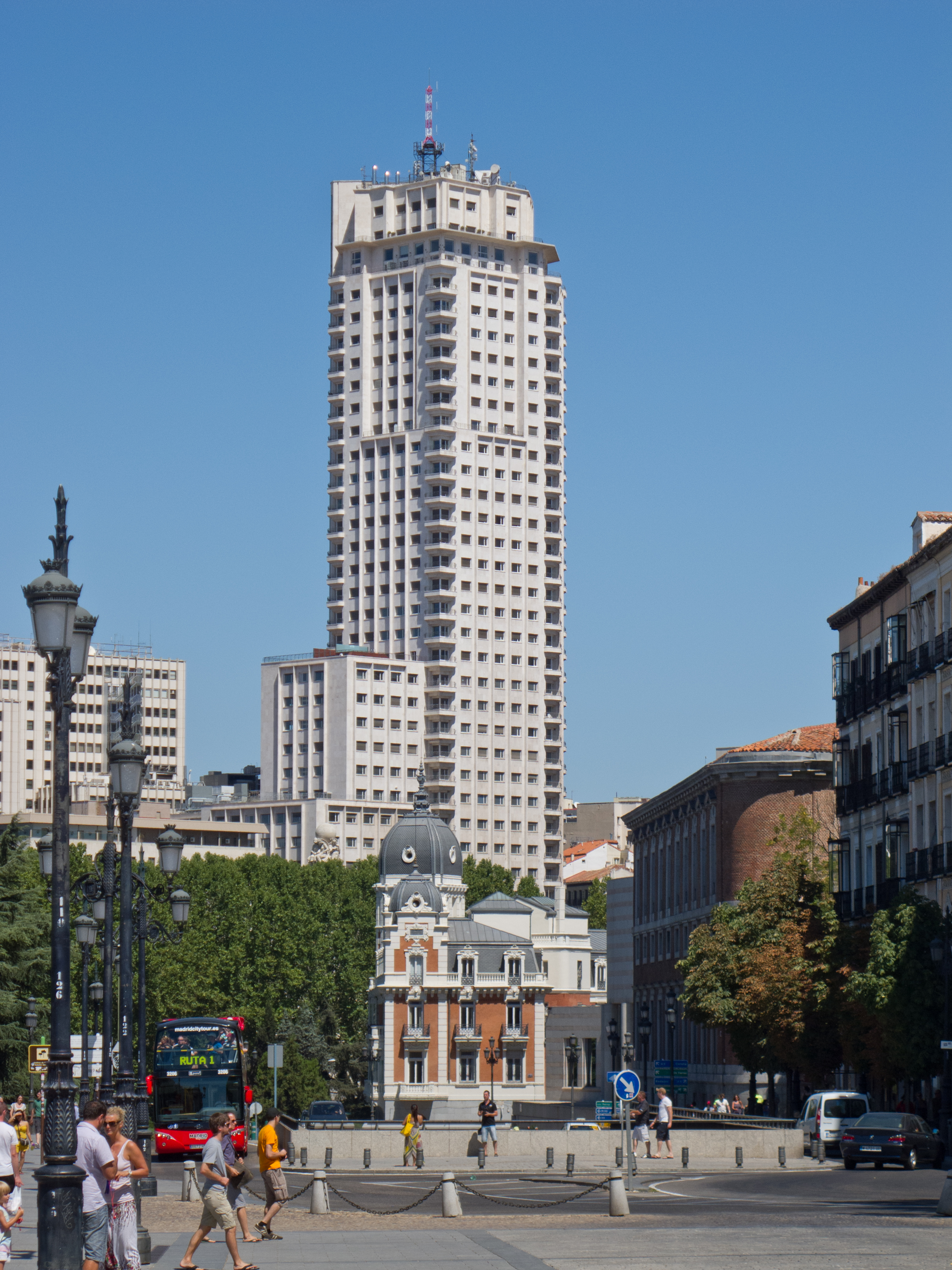
The 142 m Torre de Madrid, built in 1957, heralded the "Spanish Miracle"

The Spanish economic miracle (Spanish: milagro económico español) refers to a period of exceptionally rapid development and growth across all major areas of economic activity in Spain during the latter part of the Francoist regime, 1959 to 1974, in which GDP averaged a 6.5 percent growth rate per year, and was itself part of a much longer period of an above average GDP growth rate from 1951 to 2007. The economic boom came to an end with the 1970s international oil and stagflation crises that disrupted the industrialised world although several scholars have argued that "liabilities accumulated during years of frenzied pursuit of economic development" were in fact to blame for the slow economic growth of the late 1970s.

== Initiation of boom ==
After a very slow recovery from the devastation of the Spanish Civil War of 1936–1939, the "economic miracle" was initiated by the reforms promoted by a group of economic "technocrats" who, with the backing of Francisco Franco, put in place new policies for the economic development of Spain. The "technocrats", many of whom were members of Opus Dei, were a new breed of politician that had replaced the old Falangist guard. They abandoned a policy of autarky and implemented "development plans" which saw the liberalization of trade and the rapid growth of industry, coupled with the normalization of diplomatic ties with the United States and the United Nations after a period of initial isolation from the aftermath of World War II and diplomatic ostracism for its pro-Axis but neutral stance. From 1960 to 1975, Spain enjoyed the second highest growth rate in the world, behind only Japan, and grew to become the ninth largest economy in the world.

== Industrialization ==
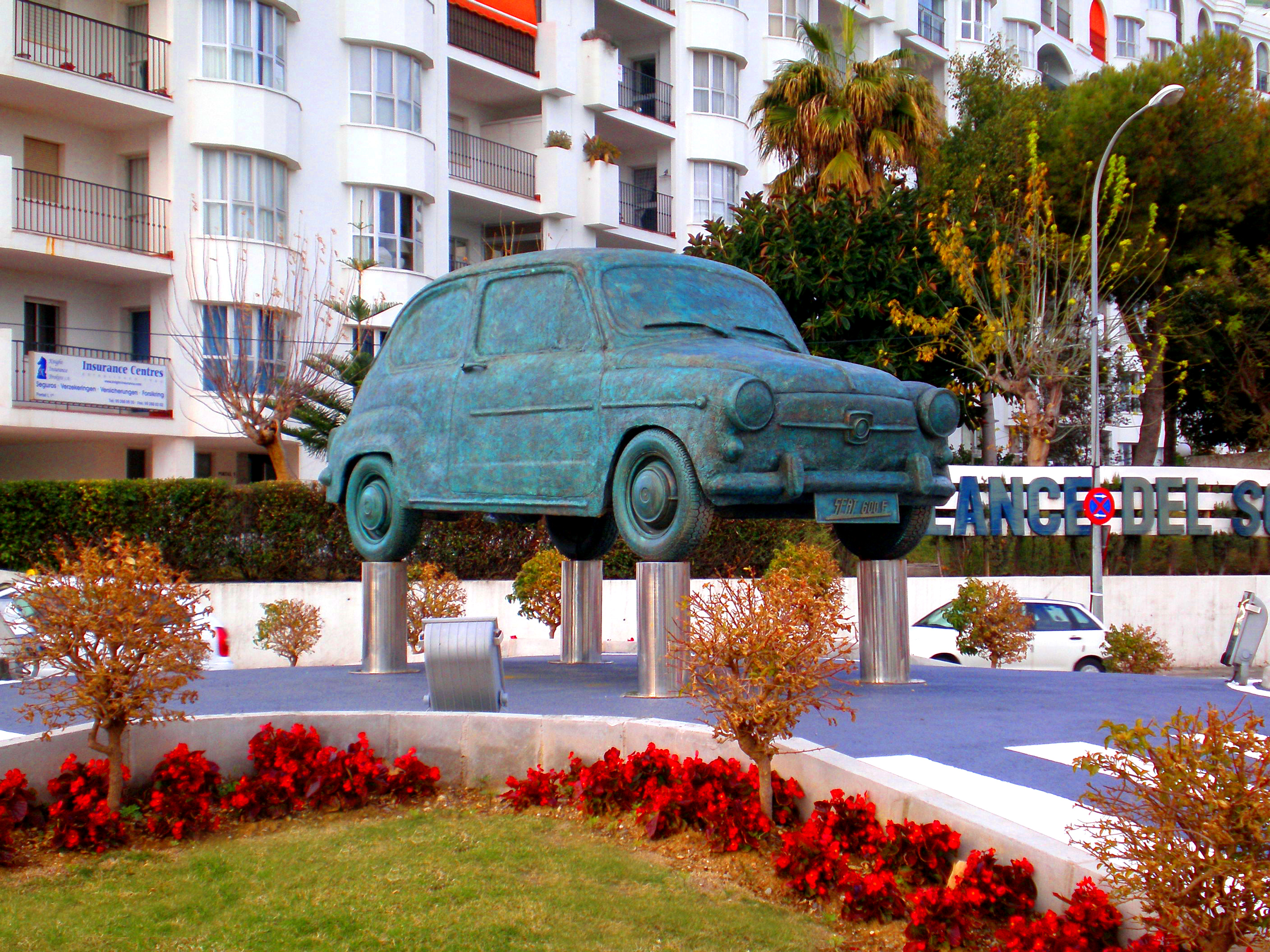
A monument in Fuengirola, Spain for the SEAT 600, a symbol of the Spanish miracle

The rapid economic expansion reinvigorated old industrial areas: the Basque Country and Ferrol northern coast (iron and steel, shipbuilding), and in and around Barcelona (machinery, textiles, cars and petrochemicals). It also drove an enormous expansion in refining, petrochemicals, chemicals and engineering. To help achieve the rapid development, there was massive government investment through key state-owned companies like the national industrial conglomerate Instituto Nacional de Industria, the mass market car company SEAT in Barcelona, the big steel plant of Ensidesa in Avilés and the shipbuilder Empresa Nacional Bazán. With heavy protection from foreign competition in the domestic Spanish market, those companies led the industrialisation of the country, restoring the prosperity of industrial areas like Barcelona and Bilbao and creating new industrial areas, most notably around Madrid. Although there was economic liberalisation in the period, key enterprises remained under state control.

=== Automotive industry ===
The automotive industry was one of the most powerful locomotoras (locomotives) of the Spanish Miracle. From 1958 to 1972, it grew at a yearly compound rate of 21.7%. In 1946, there were only 72,000 private cars in Spain, but in 1966, there were over 1 million. That growth rate had no equal in the world. The icon of the desarrollo was the SEAT 600 car, produced by the Spanish state company SEAT. More than 794,000 of them were made between 1957 and 1973. At the beginning of that period, it was the first car for many Spanish working-class families. However, at the end of the period, it was the second car for many more.

=== Rise in consumer prosperity ===
The big rise in the average standard of living during the post-war years was reflected in the possession by households of a variety of consumer goods. In 1966, 36% of households had a washing machine, 32% a television, 12% a record player, 28% a refrigerator, and 12% a car. In 1977, however, 53.1% of households by that time had a car, 74% a refrigerator, 70% a washing machine, 34% a vacuum cleaner, 41% a food processor, 80% a television, 18% a cassette recorder, 40% a still camera and 90% a transistor radio, while in 1976 28% of households had a tape recorder, 11% a radiogram, and 34% a record player.

== See also ==
- Brazilian Miracle
- Economic history of Spain
- Economic miracle
- Instituto Nacional de Industria
- Italian economic miracle
- Japanese economic miracle
- Pegaso
- SEAT
- Spain under Franco
