= List of largest daily changes in the Russell 2000 =

This is a list of the largest daily changes in the Russell 2000 Index since 1987.

== Largest percentage changes ==
Largest daily percentage gains

Rank	Date	Close	Net Change	% Change
1	2020-03-24	1,096.54	+94.14	+9.39
2	2008-10-13	570.89	+48.41	+9.27
3	2025-04-09	1,913.16	+152.45	+8.66
4	2008-11-13	491.23	+38.43	+8.49
5	2009-03-23	433.72	+33.61	+8.40
6	2020-04-06	1,138.78	+86.72	+8.24
7	2020-03-13	1,210.13	+87.20	+7.77
8	1987-10-21	130.65	+9.26	+7.63
9	2008-10-28	482.55	+34.15	+7.62
10	2008-11-21	406.54	+21.23	+7.44
11	2009-03-10	367.75	+24.49	+7.14
12	2008-09-18	723.68	+47.30	+6.99
13	2011-08-09	696.16	+45.20	+6.94
14	2008-10-16	536.57	+34.46	+6.86
15	1987-10-30	118.26	+7.46	+6.73
16	2008-12-16	482.85	+30.28	+6.69
17	2020-03-17	1,106.51	+69.09	+6.66
18	2009-03-12	390.12	+23.82	+6.50
19	2011-10-04	648.63	+39.14	+6.42
20	2020-03-26	1,180.32	+69.95	+6.30

Largest daily percentage losses

Rank	Date	Close	Net Change	% Change
1	2020-03-16	1,037.42	−172.71	−14.27
2	1987-10-19	133.60	−19.14	−12.53
3	2008-12-01	417.07	−56.07	−11.85
4	2020-03-12	1,122.93	−141.37	−11.18
5	2020-03-18	991.16	−115.35	−10.42
6	2008-10-15	502.11	−52.54	−9.47
7	2020-03-09	1,313.44	−135.78	−9.37
8	1987-10-26	110.33	−11.26	−9.26
9	1987-10-20	121.39	−12.21	−9.14
10	2011-08-08	650.96	−63.67	−8.91
11	2008-10-09	499.20	−47.37	−8.67
12	2008-11-19	412.38	−35.13	−7.85
13	2020-06-11	1,356.22	−111.17	−7.58
14	2000-04-14	453.72	−35.50	−7.26
15	2008-11-14	456.52	−34.71	−7.07
16 (tie)	2009-01-20	433.65	−32.80	−7.03
16 (tie)	2020-04-01	1,071.99	−81.11	−7.03
18	2008-09-29	657.72	−47.07	−6.68
19	2025-04-03	1,910.55	−134.82	−6.59
20	2008-11-20	385.31	−27.07	−6.56

== Largest point changes ==
Largest daily point gains

Rank	Date	Close	Net Change	% Change
1	2025-04-09	1,913.16	+152.45	+8.66
2	2024-11-06	2,392.92	+132.08	+5.84
3	2022-11-10	1,867.93	+107.53	+6.11
4	2020-03-24	1,096.54	+94.14	+9.39
5	2023-11-14	1,798.32	+92.82	+5.44
6	2026-02-06	2,670.34	+92.69	+3.60
7	2025-08-22	2,363.10	+87.85	+3.86
8	2020-03-13	1,210.13	+87.20	+7.77
9	2020-04-06	1,138.78	+86.72	+8.24
10	2026-11-09	2,840.81	+86.71	+3.15
11	2026-06-11	2,921.03	+85.57	+3.02
12	2026-03-31	2,496.37	+82.37	+3.41
13	2021-01-06	2,057.92	+78.81	+3.98
14	2020-05-18	1,333.69	+76.70	+6.10
15	2024-07-15	2,263.67	+76.65	+3.50
16	2026-04-08	2,620.46	+75.51	+2.97
17	2021-03-01	2,275.32	+74.27	+3.37
18	2024-07-10	2,125.04	+73.29	+3.57
19	2020-03-26	1,180.32	+69.95	+6.30
20	2025-05-12	2,092.20	+69.12	+3.42

Largest daily point losses

Rank	Date	Close	Net Change	% Change
1	2020-03-16	1,037.42	−172.71	−14.27
2	2020-03-12	1,122.93	−141.37	−11.18
3	2020-03-09	1,313.44	−135.78	−9.37
4	2025-04-03	1,910.55	−134.82	−6.59
5	2026-11-05	2,729.89	−127.06	−4.45
6	2020-03-18	991.16	−115.35	−10.42
7	2020-06-11	1,356.22	−111.17	−7.58
8	2024-12-18	2,231.51	−102.57	−4.39
9	2026-06-05	2,833.50	−101.83	−3.47
10	2020-03-11	1,264.30	−86.60	−6.41
11	2022-06-13	1,714.59	−85.69	−4.76
12	2021-11-26	2,245.94	−85.52	−3.67
13	2021-02-25	2,200.17	−84.21	−3.69
14	2025-04-10	1,831.39	−81.77	−4.27
15	2022-06-16	1,649.84	−81.30	−4.70
16	2021-03-23	2,185.69	−81.16	−3.58
17	2020-04-01	1,071.99	−81.11	−7.03
18	2024-02-13	1,964.17	−81.09	−3.96
19	2025-04-04	1,830.26	−80.29	−4.20
20	2022-05-05	1,871.15	−78.77	−4.04

== Largest intraday point swings ==
Rank	Date	Close	Day High	Day Low	Point Swing	Net Change
1	2025-04-09	1,913.16	1,930.60	1,732.99	197.61	+152.45
2	2025-04-07	1,810.14	1,891.16	1,733.16	158.00	−16.89
3	2020-03-16	1,037.42	1,174.97	1,035.19	142.78	−172.71
4	2024-12-18	2,231.51	2,349.98	2,215.74	134.24	−102.57
5	2020-03-12	1,122.93	1,253.87	1,121.72	132.15	−141.37
6	2026-11-05	2,729.89	2,855.25	2,723.93	131.32	−127.06
7	2026-06-09	2,867.02	2,921.33	2,795.48	125.85	+11.60
8	2021-11-26	2,245.94	2,328.98	2,215.24	113.74	−85.52
9	2021-03-05	2,192.21	2,193.27	2,085.12	108.15	+87.20
10	2022-01-24	2,033.51	2,038.66	1,931.44	107.22	+45.59
11	2021-03-04	2,146.92	2,217.05	2,110.14	106.91	−60.87
12	2021-12-01	2,147.42	2,253.37	2,147.40	105.97	−51.49
13	2020-06-11	1,356.22	1,458.34	1,355.32	103.02	−111.17
14	2022-02-24	1,996.01	1,996.84	1,894.45	102.39	+51.92
15	2020-03-13	2,305.11	2,404.25	1,109.39	100.79	+87.20
16	2025-11-20	2,305.11	2,404.25	2,303.46	100.79	−42.78
17	2020-03-11	1,264.30	1,349.24	1,249.28	99.96	−86.60
18	2021-01-06	2,057.92	2,079.72	1,980.29	99.43	+87.20
19	2020-03-18	991.16	1,062.88	966.22	96.66	−115.34
20	2026-03-09	2,553.67	2,559.16	2,463.38	95.78	+28.37

== Largest daily percentage changes per year ==
Largest daily percentage gains per year

Year	Date	Close	% Change	Weekday
2026*	2026-02-06	2,670.34	+3.60	Friday
2025	2025-04-09	1,913.16	+8.66	Wednesday
2024	2024-11-06	2,392.92	+5.84	Wednesday
2023	2023-11-14	1,798.32	+5.44	Tuesday
2022	2022-11-10	1,867.93	+6.11	Thursday
2021	2021-01-06	2,057.92	+3.98	Wednesday
2020	2020-03-24	1,096.54	+9.39	Tuesday
2019	2019-01-04	1,380.75	+3.75	Friday
2018	2018-12-26	1,329.81	+4.96	Wednesday
2017	2017-03-01	1,413.64	+1.94	Wednesday
2016	2016-01-29	1,035.38	+3.20	Friday
2015	2015-10-28	1,178.15	+2.77	Wednesday
2014	2014-12-17	1,174.83	+3.11	Wednesday
2013	2013-01-02	873.42	+2.83	Wednesday
2012	2012-06-29	798.49	+2.91	Friday
2011	2011-08-09	696.16	+6.94	Tuesday
2010	2010-05-10	689.61	+5.61	Monday
2009	2009-03-23	433.72	+8.40	Monday
2008	2008-10-13	570.89	+9.27	Monday
2007	2007-09-18	806.63	+3.97	Tuesday
2006	2006-06-29	714.32	+3.82	Thursday
2005	2005-04-21	598.98	+2.40	Thursday
2004	2004-02-06	584.07	+2.55	Friday
2003	2003-03-17	365.40	+3.11	Monday
2002	2002-07-29	400.81	+4.85	Monday
2001	2001-01-03	484.39	+4.74	Wednesday
2000	2000-04-18	486.09	+5.84	Tuesday
1999	1999-04-21	426.57	+2.70	Wednesday
1998	1998-09-08	361.93	+4.28	Tuesday
1997	1997-05-02	353.98	+2.41	Friday
1996	1996-07-17	318.19	+2.60	Wednesday
1995	1995-11-02	300.99	+1.11	Thursday
1994	1994-04-05	253.96	+2.80	Tuesday
1993	1993-09-22	246.48	+1.15	Wednesday
1992	1992-01-03	192.09	+1.77	Friday
1991	1991-01-17	130.25	+2.72	Thursday
1990	1990-08-27	138.67	+3.32	Monday
1989	1989-10-19	173.36	+1.40	Thursday
1988	1988-01-04	123.84	+2.56	Monday
1987	1987-10-21	130.65	+7.61	Wednesday

Largest daily percentage losses per year

Year	Date	Close	% Change	Weekday
2026*	2026-11-05	2,729.89	−4.45	Thursday
2025	2025-04-03	1,910.55	−6.59	Thursday
2024	2024-12-18	2,231.51	−4.39	Wednesday
2023	2023-02-21	1,888.21	−2.99	Monday
2022	2022-06-13	1,714.59	−4.76	Monday
2021	2021-02-25	2,200.17	−3.69	Thursday
2020	2020-03-16	1,037.42	−14.27	Monday
2019	2019-03-22	1,505.92	−3.62	Friday
2018	2018-12-04	1,480.75	−4.40	Tuesday
2017	2017-05-17	1,355.89	−2.78	Wednesday
2016	2016-06-24	1,127.54	−3.81	Friday
2015	2015-08-24	1,102.55	−4.82	Monday
2014	2014-02-03	1,094.59	−3.21	Monday
2013	2013-04-15	907.18	−3.78	Monday
2012	2012-06-01	737.42	−3.20	Friday
2011	2011-08-08	650.96	−8.91	Monday
2010	2010-05-20	640.04	−5.09	Thursday
2009	2009-01-20	433.65	−7.03	Tuesday
2008	2008-12-01	417.07	−11.85	Monday
2007	2007-11-01	795.18	−3.97	Thursday
2006	2006-06-05	713.92	−3.19	Monday
2005	2005-10-05	644.98	−2.84	Wednesday
2004	2004-07-21	548.57	−2.77	Wednesday
2003	2003-07-17	459.93	−2.90	Thursday
2002	2002-07-23	363.99	−4.12	Tuesday
2001	2001-09-17	417.67	−5.23	Monday
2000	2000-04-14	453.72	-7.26	Friday
1999	1999-03-23	383.37	−2.50	Tuesday
1998	1998-08-31	337.95	−5.74	Monday
1997	1997-10-27	420.13	−6.12	Monday
1996	1996-07-15	314.72	−2.77	Monday
1995	1995-07-19	287.07	−2.22	Wednesday
1994	1994-02-04	261.67	−2.21	Friday
1993	1993-02-16	221.20	−3.28	Tuesday
1992	1992-06-17	189.30	−1.83	Wednesday
1991	1991-11-15	181.72	−3.25	Friday
1990	1990-08-23	132.92	−4.37	Thursday
1989	1989-10-13	172.84	−3.73	Friday
1988	1988-01-08	123.50	−3.27	Friday
1987	1987-10-19	133.60	−12.53	Monday

- Year has not yet ended.

== See also ==
- Russell 2000 Index
- List of largest daily changes in the S&P 500 Index
- List of largest daily changes in the Nasdaq Composite
- List of largest daily changes in the Dow Jones Industrial Average
