= List of largest daily changes in the Nasdaq Composite =

This is a list of the largest daily changes in the Nasdaq Composite from 1971.

== Largest percentage changes ==
Largest daily percentage gains

| Rank | Date | Close | Net Change | % Change |
|---|---|---|---|---|
| 1 | 2001-01-03 | 2,616.69 | +324.83 | +14.17 |
| 2 | 2025-04-09 | 17,124.97 | +1,857.06 | +12.16 |
| 3 | 2008-10-13 | 1,844.25 | +194.74 | +11.81 |
| 4 | 2000-12-05 | 2,889.80 | +274.05 | +10.48 |
| 5 | 2008-10-28 | 1,649.47 | +143.57 | +9.53 |
| 6 | 2020-03-13 | 7,874.88 | +673.07 | +9.35 |
| 7 | 2001-04-05 | 1,785.00 | +146.20 | +8.92 |
| 8 | 2001-04-18 | 2,079.44 | +156.22 | +8.123 |
| 9 | 2020-03-24 | 7,417.86 | +557.18 | +8.121 |
| 10 | 2000-05-30 | 3,459.48 | +254.37 | +7.94 |
| 11 | 2000-10-13 | 3,316.77 | +242.09 | +7.87 |
| 12 | 2000-10-19 | 3,418.60 | +247.04 | +7.79 |
| 13 | 2002-05-08 | 1,696.29 | +122.47 | +7.78 |
| 14 | 2000-12-22 | 2,517.02 | +176.90 | +7.56 |
| 15 | 1987-10-21 | 351.90 | +24.10 | +7.352 |
| 16 | 2022-11-10 | 11,114.15 | +760.97 | +7.350 |
| 17 | 2020-04-06 | 7,913.24 | +540.15 | +7.33 |
| 18 | 2000-04-18 | 3,793.57 | +254.41 | +7.19 |
| 19 | 2009-03-10 | 1,358.28 | +89.64 | +7.07 |
| 20 | 2009-03-23 | 1,555.77 | +98.50 | +6.76 |

Largest daily percentage losses

| Rank | Date | Close | Net Change | % Change |
|---|---|---|---|---|
| 1 | 2020-03-16 | 6,904.59 | −970.28 | −12.32 |
| 2 | 1987-10-19 | 360.20 | −46.10 | −11.35 |
| 3 | 2000-04-14 | 3,321.29 | −355.49 | −9.67 |
| 4 | 2020-03-12 | 7,201.80 | −750.25 | −9.43 |
| 5 | 2008-09-29 | 1,983.73 | −199.61 | −9.14 |
| 6 | 1987-10-26 | 298.90 | −29.60 | −9.01 |
| 7 | 1987-10-20 | 327.80 | −32.40 | −9.00 |
| 8 | 2008-12-01 | 1,398.07 | −137.50 | −8.95 |
| 9 | 1998-08-31 | 1,499.25 | −140.43 | −8.56 |
| 10 | 2008-10-15 | 1,628.33 | −150.68 | −8.47 |
| 11 | 2000-04-03 | 4,223.68 | −349.15 | −7.64 |
| 12 | 2020-03-09 | 7,950.68 | −624.94 | −7.29 |
| 13 | 2001-01-02 | 2,291.86 | −178.66 | −7.23 |
| 14 | 2000-12-20 | 2,332.78 | −178.93 | −7.12 |
| 15 | 2000-04-12 | 3,769.63 | −286.27 | −7.06 |
| 16 | 1997-10-27 | 1,535.09 | −115.83 | −7.02 |
| 17 | 2011-08-08 | 2,357.69 | −174.72 | −6.90 |
| 18 | 2001-09-17 | 1,579.55 | −115.83 | −6.83 |
| 19 | 2008-11-19 | 1,386.42 | −96.85 | −6.53 |
| 20 | 2001-03-12 | 1,923.38 | −129.40 | −6.30 |

== Largest point changes ==
Largest daily point gains

| Rank | Date | Close | Net Change | % Change |
|---|---|---|---|---|
| 1 | 2025-04-09 | 17,124.97 | +1,857.06 | +12.16 |
| 2 | 2026-03-31 | 21,590.63 | +795.99 | +3.83 |
| 3 | 2026-06-15 | 26,683.94 | +795.10 | +3.07 |
| 4 | 2025-05-12 | 18,708.34 | +779.43 | +4.35 |
| 5 | 2022-11-10 | 11,114.15 | +760.97 | +7.35 |
| 6 | 2026-07-30 | 25,122.18 | +679.24 | +2.78 |
| 7 | 2026-11-09 | 25,253.14 | +673.71 | +2.74 |
| 8 | 2020-03-13 | 7,874.88 | +673.07 | +9.35 |
| 9 | 2026-08-04 | 26,584.99 | +671.09 | +2.59 |
| 10 | 2026-06-11 | 25,809.66 | +640.16 | +2.54 |
| 11 | 2026-04-08 | 22,634.99 | +617.14 | +2.80 |
| 12 | 2026-09-21 | 27,122.09 | +599.54 | +2.26 |
| 13 | 2025-11-24 | 22,872.01 | +598.93 | +2.69 |
| 14 | 2020-03-24 | 7,417.86 | +557.18 | +8.12 |
| 15 | 2024-11-06 | 18,983.47 | +544.29 | +2.95 |
| 16 | 2020-04-06 | 7,913.24 | +540.15 | +7.33 |
| 17 | 2026-08-03 | 25,913.90 | +540.05 | +2.13 |
| 18 | 2025-11-10 | 23,527.17 | +522.64 | +2.27 |
| 19 | 2026-06-29 | 25,820.14 | +522.52 | +2.07 |
| 20 | 2026-05-06 | 25,838.94 | +512.81 | +2.02 |

Largest daily point losses

| Rank | Date | Close | Net Change | % Change |
|---|---|---|---|---|
| 1 | 2026-11-05 | 24,315.00 | −1,421.52 | −5.52 |
| 2 | 2026-11-20 | 22,617.73 | −1,261.47 | −5.28 |
| 3 | 2026-06-05 | 25,709.43 | −1,121.53 | −4.18 |
| 4 | 2025-04-03 | 16,550.61 | −1,050.44 | −5.97 |
| 5 | 2020-03-16 | 6,904.59 | −970.28 | −12.32 |
| 6 | 2025-04-04 | 15,587.79 | −962.82 | −5.82 |
| 7 | 2025-10-10 | 22,204.43 | −820.20 | −3.56 |
| 8 | 2020-03-12 | 7,201.80 | −750.25 | −9.43 |
| 9 | 2026-10-30 | 25,437.00 | −747.72 | −2.86 |
| 10 | 2025-04-10 | 16,387.31 | −737.66 | −4.31 |
| 11 | 2025-03-10 | 17,468.32 | −727.90 | −4.00 |
| 12 | 2024-12-18 | 19,392.69 | −716.37 | −3.56 |
| 13 | 2026-10-22 | 26,008.86 | −694.00 | −2.60 |
| 14 | 2024-07-24 | 17,342.41 | −654.94 | −3.64 |
| 15 | 2022-05-05 | 12,317.69 | −647.16 | −4.99 |
| 16 | 2022-09-13 | 11,633.57 | −632.84 | −5.16 |
| 17 | 2026-11-16 | 24,509.76 | −626.52 | −2.49 |
| 18 | 2020-03-09 | 7,950.68 | −624.94 | −7.29 |
| 19 | 2025-01-27 | 19,341.83 | −612.47 | −3.07 |
| 20 | 2020-09-03 | 11,458.10 | −598.34 | −4.96 |

== Largest intraday point swings ==
This table shows the largest intraday point swings since 1985.

| Rank | Date | Close | Day High | Day Low | Point Swing | Net Change |
|---|---|---|---|---|---|---|
| 1 | 2025-04-09 | 17,124.97 | 17,202.94 | 15,270.28 | 1,932.66 | +1,857.06 |
| 2 | 2025-04-07 | 15,603.26 | 16,292.28 | 14,784.03 | 1,508.25 | +15.48 |
| 3 | 2026-11-05 | 24,315.00 | 25,559.03 | 24,262.14 | 1,296.89 | −1,421.52 |
| 4 | 2026-06-09 | 25,678.82 | 26,259.92 | 24,980.38 | 1,279.54 | −250.84 |
| 5 | 2025-04-08 | 15,267.91 | 16,316.50 | 15,053.39 | 1,263.11 | −335.35 |
| 6 | 2025-11-20 | 22,078.05 | 23,147.33 | 22,043.20 | 1,104.13 | −486.18 |
| 7 | 2026-11-19 | 23,879.20 | 24,939.62 | 23,870.70 | 1,068.92 | −550.68 |
| 8 | 2025-10-10 | 22,204.43 | 23,119.91 | 22,193.07 | 926.84 | −820.20 |
| 9 | 2026-06-05 | 25,709.43 | 26,572.25 | 25,648.47 | 923.78 | −1,121.53 |
| 10 | 2022-02-24 | 13,473.58 | 13,486.11 | 12,587.90 | 898.23 | +436.09 |
| 11 | 2024-12-18 | 19,392.69 | 20,179.77 | 19,336.59 | 843.18 | −716.37 |
| 12 | 2025-04-10 | 16,387.31 | 16,712.37 | 15,894.26 | 818.11 | −737.66 |
| 13 | 2022-01-24 | 13,855.13 | 13,876.61 | 13,094.65 | 781.96 | +86.21 |
| 14 | 2025-03-03 | 18,350.19 | 18,992.30 | 18,216.63 | 775.67 | −497.09 |
| 15 | 2026-06-11 | 25,809.66 | 25,846.56 | 25,109.40 | 737.16 | +640.16 |
| 16 | 2025-02-27 | 18,544.42 | 19,242.69 | 18,535.22 | 707.47 | −530.85 |
| 17 | 2026-03-09 | 22,695.94 | 22,741.02 | 22,061.97 | 679.05 | +308.27 |
| 18 | 2020-03-13 | 7,874.23 | 7,875.93 | 7,219.09 | 656.84 | +672.43 |
| 19 | 2020-09-04 | 11,313.13 | 11,531.18 | 10,875.87 | 655.31 | −144.97 |
| 20 | 2000-04-04 | 4,148.89 | 4,283.45 | 3,649.11 | 634.34 | −74.79 |

== Largest intraday percentage changes ==
Largest intraday percentage gains

An intraday percentage gain is defined as the difference between the previous trading session's closing price and the intraday high of the following trading session. The closing percentage change denotes the ultimate percentage change recorded after the corresponding trading session's close.

| Rank | Date | Previous session's close | Following session's high | Intraday percentage gain | Closing percentage change |
|---|---|---|---|---|---|
| 1 | 2001-01-03 | 2,291.86 | 2,618.03 | +14.23% | +14.17% |
| 2 | 2025-04-09 | 15,267.91 | 17,202.94 | +12.16% | +12.16% |
| 3 | 2008-10-13 | 1,649.51 | 1,844.25 | +11.81% | +11.81% |
| 4 | 2001-04-18 | 1,923.22 | 2,129.31 | +10.72% | +8.12% |
| 5 | 2000-12-05 | 2,615.75 | 2,889.80 | +10.48% | +10.48% |
| 6 | 2008-10-28 | 1,505.90 | 1,649.47 | +9.53% | +9.53% |
| 7 | 2020-03-13 | 7,201.80 | 7,875.93 | +9.36% | +9.35% |
| 8 | 2001-04-05 | 1,638.80 | 1,785.73 | +8.97% | +8.92% |
| 9 | 2020-03-24 | 6,860.57 | 7,418.37 | +8.13% | +8.12% |
| 10 | 2000-05-30 | 3,205.11 | 3,460.24 | +7.96% | +7.94% |
| 11 | 2000-10-19 | 3,171.56 | 3,423.45 | +7.94% | +7.79% |
| 12 | 2000-10-13 | 3,074.68 | 3,316.97 | +7.88% | +7.87% |
| 13 | 2002-05-08 | 1,573.82 | 1,696.35 | +7.79% | +7.78% |
| 14 | 2020-04-06 | 7,373.08 | 7,938.33 | +7.67% | +7.33% |
| 15 | 2000-12-22 | 2,340.12 | 2,517.93 | +7.60% | +7.56% |
| 16 | 1987-10-21 | 327.80 | 352.30 | +7.47% | +7.35% |
| 17 | 2020-03-17 | 6,904.59 | 7,406.23 | +7.27% | +6.23% |
| 18 | 2000-04-18 | 3,539.16 | 3,794.97 | +7.23% | +7.19% |
| 19 | 2009-03-10 | 1,268.64 | 1,358.28 | +7.07% | +7.07% |
| 20 | 2001-04-10 | 1,745.71 | 1,868.10 | +7.01% | +6.09% |

Largest intraday percentage drops

An intraday percentage drop is defined as the difference between the previous trading session's closing price and the intraday low of the following trading session. The closing percentage change denotes the ultimate percentage change recorded after the corresponding trading session's close.

| Rank | Date | Previous session's close | Following session's low | Intraday percentage drop | Closing percentage change |
|---|---|---|---|---|---|
| 1 | 2000-04-04 | 4,223.68 | 3,649.11 | −13.60% | −1.77% |
| 2 | 2020-03-16 | 7,874.88 | 6,882.86 | −12.60% | −12.32% |
| 3 | 1987-10-19 | 406.30 | 360.20 | −11.35% | −11.35% |
| 4 | 2000-04-14 | 3,676.78 | 3,265.98 | −11.17% | −9.67% |
| 5 | 2020-03-12 | 7,952.05 | 7,194.67 | −9.52% | −9.43% |
| 6 | 1987-10-20 | 360.20 | 326.60 | −9.33% | −9.00% |
| 7 | 2008-09-29 | 2,183.34 | 1,983.73 | −9.14% | −9.14% |
| 8 (tie) | 1987-10-26 | 328.50 | 298.90 | −9.01% | −9.01% |
| 8 (tie) | 2010-05-06 | 2,402.29 | 2,185.75 | −9.01% | −3.44% |
| 10 | 2008-12-01 | 1,535.57 | 1,398.07 | −8.95% | −8.95% |
| 11 | 2020-03-18 | 7,334.78 | 6,686.36 | −8.84% | −4.70% |
| 12 | 2015-08-24 | 4,706.04 | 4,292.14 | −8.80% | −3.82% |
| 13 | 2008-10-06 | 1,947.39 | 1,777.02 | −8.75% | −4.34% |
| 14 | 1998-08-31 | 1,639.68 | 1,498.73 | −8.60% | −8.56% |
| 15 | 2008-10-15 | 1,779.01 | 1,628.33 | −8.47% | −8.47% |
| 16 | 2000-04-03 | 4,572.83 | 4,193.10 | −8.30% | −7.64% |
| 17 | 2000-04-24 | 3,643.88 | 3,345.25 | −8.20% | −4.43% |
| 18 | 2001-01-02 | 2,470.52 | 2,273.07 | −7.99% | −7.23% |
| 19 | 2000-12-20 | 2,511.71 | 2,312.51 | −7.93% | −7.12% |
| 20 | 2020-03-09 | 8,575.62 | 7,943.16 | −7.38% | −7.29% |

== Largest intraday percentage turnovers ==
Largest intraday percentage drops that closed positive

These are the largest intraday percentage drops that had been completely reversed and erased at the close of the respective trading session.

| Rank | Date | Previous session's close | Following session's low | Intraday percentage drop | Closing percentage change |
|---|---|---|---|---|---|
| 1 | 2008-10-10 | 1,645.12 | 1,542.45 | −6.24% | +0.27% |
| 2 | 2025-04-07 | 15,587.79 | 14,784.03 | −5.15% | +0.10% |
| 3 | 2022-01-24 | 13,768.92 | 13,094.65 | −4.90% | +0.63% |
| 4 | 2008-11-13 | 1,499.21 | 1,428.54 | −4.71% | +6.50% |
| 5 | 2000-10-26 | 3,229.57 | 3,081.36 | −4.59% | +1.32% |
| 6 | 1997-10-28 | 1,535.09 | 1,465.84 | −4.51% | +4.25% |
| 7 | 2002-07-15 | 1,373.50 | 1,315.30 | −4.24% | +0.66% |
| 8 | 2001-02-23 | 2,244.96 | 2,156.29 | −3.95% | +0.78% |
| 9 | 2008-01-23 | 2,292.27 | 2,202.54 | −3.92% | +1.05% |
| 10 (tie) | 2000-05-24 | 3,164.55 | 3,042.66 | −3.85% | +3.35% |
| 10 (tie) | 2008-10-16 | 1,628.33 | 1,565.72 | −3.85% | +5.49% |
| 12 | 2001-03-01 | 2,151.83 | 2,071.03 | −3.76% | +1.47% |
| 13 | 2000-08-03 | 3,658.46 | 3,521.14 | −3.75% | +2.77% |
| 14 | 2000-01-31 | 3,887.07 | 3,748.03 | −3.58% | +1.37% |
| 15 | 2020-02-28 | 8,566.48 | 8,264.16 | −3.53% | +0.01% |
| 16 | 2008-11-18 | 1,482.05 | 1,429.92 | −3.52% | +0.08% |
| 17 | 2022-02-24 | 13,037.49 | 12,587.88 | −3.45% | +3.34% |
| 18 | 2002-06-14 | 1,496.86 | 1,445.44 | −3.44% | +0.53% |
| 19 | 2002-06-26 | 1,423.99 | 1,375.53 | −3.40% | +0.38% |
| 20 | 2000-04-05 | 4,148.89 | 4,009.09 | −3.37% | +0.49% |

Largest intraday percentage gains that closed negative

These are the largest intraday percentage gains that had been completely reversed and erased at the close of the respective trading session.

| Rank | Date | Previous session's close | Following session's high | Intraday percentage gain | Closing percentage change |
|---|---|---|---|---|---|
| 1 | 2000-04-13 | 3,769.63 | 3,914.68 | +3.85% | −2.46% |
| 2 | 2008-10-17 | 1,717.71 | 1,782.58 | +3.78% | −0.37% |
| 3 | 2015-08-25 | 4,526.25 | 4,689.54 | +3.61% | −0.44% |
| 4 | 2008-10-03 | 1,976.72 | 2,046.81 | +3.55% | −1.48% |
| 5 | 2020-03-25 | 7,417.86 | 7,671.21 | +3.42% | −0.45% |
| 6 | 2000-11-27 | 2,904.38 | 2,998.75 | +3.25% | −0.82% |
| 7 (tie) | 2000-05-25 | 3,270.61 | 3,367.71 | +2.97% | −2.00% |
| 7 (tie) | 2001-03-15 | 1,972.09 | 2,030.73 | +2.97% | −1.59% |
| 9 | 2008-10-08 | 1,754.88 | 1,806.89 | +2.96% | −0.83% |
| 10 | 2020-04-07 | 7,913.24 | 8,146.43 | +2.95% | −0.33% |
| 11 | 2008-10-14 | 1,844.25 | 1,896.95 | +2.86% | −3.54% |
| 12 | 2020-03-20 | 7,150.58 | 7,354.44 | +2.85% | −3.79% |
| 13 | 2001-11-08 | 1,837.53 | 1,888.39 | +2.77% | −0.53% |
| 14 (tie) | 2000-12-18 | 2,653.27 | 2,726.20 | +2.75% | −1.08% |
| 14 (tie) | 2000-12-19 | 2,624.52 | 2,696.61 | +2.75% | −4.30% |
| 16 | 2008-10-09 | 1,740.33 | 1,787.41 | +2.71% | −5.47% |
| 17 (tie) | 1987-10-27 | 298.90 | 306.90 | +2.68% | −0.87% |
| 17 (tie) | 1998-10-06 | 1,536.69 | 1,577.87 | +2.68% | −1.68% |
| 19 | 2001-02-13 | 2,489.66 | 2,554.65 | +2.61% | −2.49% |
| 20 | 2000-10-12 | 3,168.49 | 3,249.11 | +2.54% | −2.96% |

== Largest daily percentage changes per year ==
Largest daily percentage gains per year

| Year | Date | Close | % Change | Weekday |
|---|---|---|---|---|
| 2026* | 2026-03-31 | 21,590.63 | +3.83 | Tuesday |
| 2025 | 2025-04-09 | 17,124.97 | +12.16 | Wednesday |
| 2024 | 2024-02-22 | 16,041.62 | +2.96 | Thursday |
| 2023 | 2023-01-06 | 10,569.29 | +2.56 | Friday |
| 2022 | 2022-11-10 | 11,114.15 | +7.35 | Thursday |
| 2021 | 2021-03-09 | 13,073.82 | +3.69 | Tuesday |
| 2020 | 2020-03-13 | 7,874.88 | +9.35 | Friday |
| 2019 | 2019-01-04 | 6,738.86 | +4.26 | Friday |
| 2018 | 2018-12-26 | 6,554.35 | +5.84 | Wednesday |
| 2017 | 2017-10-27 | 6,701.26 | +2.20 | Friday |
| 2016 | 2016-03-01 | 4,689.60 | +2.89 | Tuesday |
| 2015 | 2015-08-26 | 4,697.54 | +4.24 | Wednesday |
| 2014 | 2014-10-21 | 4,419.48 | +2.40 | Tuesday |
| 2013 | 2013-01-02 | 3,112.26 | +3.07 | Wednesday |
| 2012 | 2012-06-29 | 2,935.05 | +3.00 | Friday |
| 2011 | 2011-08-09 | 2,482.52 | +5.29 | Tuesday |
| 2010 | 2010-05-10 | 2,374.67 | +4.81 | Monday |
| 2009 | 2009-03-10 | 1,358.28 | +7.07 | Tuesday |
| 2008 | 2008-10-13 | 1,844.25 | +11.81 | Monday |
| 2007 | 2007-11-13 | 2,673.65 | +3.46 | Tuesday |
| 2006 | 2006-06-29 | 2,174.38 | +2.96 | Thursday |
| 2005 | 2005-04-21 | 1,962.41 | +2.54 | Thursday |
| 2004 | 2004-03-25 | 1,967.17 | +3.02 | Thursday |
| 2003 | 2003-03-13 | 1,340.77 | +4.81 | Thursday |
| 2002 | 2002-05-08 | 1,696.29 | +7.78 | Wednesday |
| 2001 | 2001-01-03 | 2,616.69 | +14.17 | Wednesday |
| 2000 | 2000-12-05 | 2,889.80 | +10.48 | Tuesday |
| 1999 | 1999-06-16 | 2,517.83 | +4.27 | Wednesday |
| 1998 | 1998-09-08 | 1,660.86 | +6.02 | Tuesday |
| 1997 | 1997-10-28 | 1,600.34 | +4.25 | Tuesday |
| 1996 | 1996-07-17 | 1,086.65 | +3.15 | Thursday |
| 1995 | 1995-12-19 | 1,026.41 | +2.38 | Tuesday |
| 1994 | 1994-04-05 | 750.95 | +3.24 | Tuesday |
| 1993 | 1993-05-04 | 678.16 | +1.72 | Tuesday |
| 1992 | 1992-01-22 | 620.68 | +2.61 | Wednesday |
| 1991 | 1991-08-21 | 517.97 | +3.17 | Wednesday |
| 1990 | 1990-08-27 | 381.27 | +3.79 | Monday |
| 1989 | 1989-10-19 | 470.80 | +1.62 | Thursday |
| 1988 | 1988-01-04 | 338.48 | +2.42 | Monday |
| 1987 | 1987-10-21 | 351.86 | +7.34 | Wednesday |
| 1986 | 1986-04-16 | 387.64 | +1.55 | Wednesday |
| 1985 | 1985-05-10 | 287.46 | +1.48 | Friday |
| 1984 | 1984-08-03 | 246.24 | +3.09 | Friday |
| 1983 | 1983-07-20 | 316.76 | +1.80 | Wednesday |
| 1982 | 1982-11-03 | 222.77 | +2.35 | Tuesday |
| 1981 | 1981-09-29 | 178.51 | +1.99 | Tuesday |
| 1980 | 1980-03-28 | 129.25 | +4.16 | Friday |
| 1979 | 1979-11-26 | 141.95 | +1.50 | Monday |
| 1978 | 1978-11-01 | 114.65 | +3.18 | Wednesday |
| 1977 | 1977-11-10 | 99.98 | +1.30 | Thursday |
| 1976 | 1976-01-06 | 80.27 | +1.92 | Tuesday |
| 1975 | 1975-01-27 | 67.04 | +2.54 | Monday |
| 1974 | 1974-10-10 | 59.13 | +2.71 | Thursday |
| 1973 | 1973-05-24 | 104.27 | +2.14 | Thursday |
| 1972 | 1972-12-29 | 133.73 | +1.36 | Thursday |
| 1971 | 1971-08-16 | 107.86 | +2.30 | Monday |

Largest daily percentage losses per year

| Year | Date | Close | % Change | Weekday |
|---|---|---|---|---|
| 2026* | 2026-11-05 | 24,315.00 | −5.52 | Thursday |
| 2025 | 2025-04-03 | 16,550.60 | −5.97 | Thursday |
| 2024 | 2024-07-24 | 17,342.41 | −3.64 | Wednesday |
| 2023 | 2023-02-21 | 11,492.30 | −2.50 | Monday |
| 2022 | 2022-09-13 | 11,633.57 | −5.16 | Tuesday |
| 2021 | 2021-02-25 | 13,119.43 | −3.52 | Thursday |
| 2020 | 2020-03-16 | 6,904.59 | −12.32 | Monday |
| 2019 | 2019-08-05 | 7,726.04 | −3.47 | Monday |
| 2018 | 2018-10-24 | 7,108.40 | −4.43 | Wednesday |
| 2017 | 2017-05-17 | 6,011.24 | −2.57 | Wednesday |
| 2016 | 2016-06-24 | 4,707.98 | −4.12 | Friday |
| 2015 | 2015-08-24 | 4,526.25 | −3.82 | Monday |
| 2014 | 2014-04-10 | 4,054.11 | −3.10 | Thursday |
| 2013 | 2013-04-15 | 3,216.49 | −2.38 | Monday |
| 2012 | 2012-06-01 | 2,747.48 | −2.82 | Friday |
| 2011 | 2011-08-08 | 2,357.69 | −6.90 | Monday |
| 2010 | 2010-05-20 | 2,204.01 | −4.11 | Thursday |
| 2009 | 2009-01-20 | 1,440.86 | −5.78 | Tuesday |
| 2008 | 2008-09-29 | 1,983.73 | −9.14 | Monday |
| 2007 | 2007-02-27 | 2,407.86 | −3.86 | Tuesday |
| 2006 | 2006-01-20 | 2,247.70 | −2.35 | Friday |
| 2005 | 2005-01-04 | 2,107.86 | −2.06 | Tuesday |
| 2004 | 2004-02-04 | 2,014.14 | −2.52 | Wednesday |
| 2003 | 2003-03-24 | 1,369.78 | −3.66 | Monday |
| 2002 | 2002-07-23 | 1,229.05 | −4.18 | Tuesday |
| 2001 | 2001-01-02 | 2,291.86 | −7.23 | Tuesday |
| 2000 | 2000-04-14 | 3,321.29 | -9.67 | Friday |
| 1999 | 1999-04-19 | 2,345.61 | −5.57 | Monday |
| 1998 | 1998-08-31 | 1,499.25 | −8.56 | Monday |
| 1997 | 1997-10-27 | 1,535.09 | −7.02 | Monday |
| 1996 | 1996-07-15 | 1,060.19 | −3.92 | Monday |
| 1995 | 1995-07-19 | 952.83 | −3.61 | Wednesday |
| 1994 | 1994-02-04 | 777.28 | −2.57 | Friday |
| 1993 | 1993-02-16 | 665.39 | −3.64 | Tuesday |
| 1992 | 1992-04-20 | 577.20 | −2.47 | Monday |
| 1991 | 1991-11-15 | 531.29 | −4.24 | Friday |
| 1990 | 1990-08-06 | 400.04 | −4.17 | Monday |
| 1989 | 1989-10-13 | 467.29 | −3.09 | Friday |
| 1988 | 1988-01-08 | 338.47 | −3.20 | Friday |
| 1987 | 1987-10-19 | 360.20 | −11.35 | Monday |
| 1986 | 1986-09-11 | 353.34 | −3.67 | Thursday |
| 1985 | 1985-09-17 | 281.07 | −1.51 | Tuesday |
| 1984 | 1984-02-06 | 258.64 | −2.03 | Monday |
| 1983 | 1983-01-24 | 236.73 | −2.97 | Monday |
| 1982 | 1982-12-15 | 225.69 | −2.44 | Wednesday |
| 1981 | 1981-01-07 | 197.35 | −3.29 | Wednesday |
| 1980 | 1980-03-27 | 124.09 | −6.15 | Thursday |
| 1979 | 1979-10-10 | 139.31 | −4.06 | Wednesday |
| 1978 | 1978-10-20 | 123.82 | −2.67 | Friday |
| 1977 | 1977-10-12 | 99.83 | −1.38 | Wednesday |
| 1976 | 1976-03-15 | 89.72 | −1.40 | Monday |
| 1975 | 1975-12-03 | 75.67 | −2.15 | Wednesday |
| 1974 | 1974-11-18 | 62.09 | −3.60 | Monday |
| 1973 | 1973-11-26 | 94.13 | −3.26 | Monday |
| 1972 | 1972-05-09 | 125.78 | −2.21 | Tuesday |
| 1971 | 1971-06-21 | 106.50 | −1.54 | Monday |

- Year has not yet ended.

== See also ==
- Nasdaq Composite
- Closing milestones of the Nasdaq Composite
- List of largest daily changes in the Dow Jones Industrial Average
- List of largest daily changes in the S&P 500 Index
- List of largest daily changes in the Russell 2000
- List of stock market crashes and bear markets
