= List of largest daily changes in the S&P 500 Index =

This is a list of the largest daily changes in the S&P 500 from 1923. Compare to the list of largest daily changes in the Dow Jones Industrial Average.

== Largest percentage changes ==
While the S&P 500 was first introduced in 1923, it was not until 1957 that the stock market index was formally recognized: therefore, some of the following records may not be known by sources.

Largest daily percentage gains
Rank	Date	Close	Change	
Rank	Date	Close	Net	%
1	1933-03-15	6.81	+0.97	+16.61
2	1929-10-30	22.99	+2.56	+12.53
3	1931-10-06	9.91	+1.09	+12.36
4	1932-09-21	8.52	+0.90	+11.81
5	2008-10-13	1,003.35	+104.13	+11.58
6	2008-10-28	940.51	+91.59	+10.79
7	1939-09-05	12.64	+1.11	+9.63
8	1933-04-20	7.82	+0.68	+9.52
8	2025-04-09	5,456.90	+474.13	+9.52
10	2020-03-24	2,447.33	+209.93	+9.38
11	2020-03-13	2,711.02	+230.38	+9.29
12	1987-10-21	258.38	+21.55	+9.10
13	1929-11-14	19.24	+1.58	+8.95
14	1932-08-03	6.39	+0.52	+8.86
15	1931-10-08	10.62	+0.84	+8.59
16	1932-02-13	8.80	+0.68	+8.37
17	1931-12-18	8.36	+0.64	+8.29
18	1932-02-11	8.12	+0.62	+8.27
19	1933-07-24	10.50	+0.79	+8.14
20	1932-06-10	4.92	+0.35	+7.66

Largest daily percentage losses
Rank	Date	Close	Change	
Rank	Date	Close	Net	%
1	1987-10-19	224.84	−57.86	−20.47
2	1929-10-28	22.74	−3.20	−12.34
3	2020-03-16	2,386.13	−324.89	−11.98
4	1929-10-29	20.43	−2.31	−10.16
5	1929-11-06	20.61	−2.27	−9.92
6	2020-03-12	2,480.64	−260.74	−9.51
7	1937-10-18	10.76	−1.10	−9.27
8	2008-10-15	907.84	−90.17	−9.04
9	2008-12-01	816.21	−80.03	−8.93
10	1933-07-20	10.57	−1.03	−8.88
11	2008-09-29	1,106.39	−106.62	−8.79
12	1933-07-21	9.65	−0.92	−8.70
13	1987-10-26	227.67	−20.55	−8.28
14	1932-10-05	7.39	−0.66	−8.20
15	1932-08-12	7.00	−0.61	−8.02
16	1932-05-31	4.47	−0.38	−7.84
17	1934-07-26	8.36	−0.71	−7.83
18	2008-10-09	909.92	−75.02	−7.62
19	2020-03-09	2,746.56	−225.81	−7.60
20	1940-05-14	10.28	−0.83	−7.47

== Largest closing point changes ==
The two tables below show the largest one-day changes between the previous trading day's close and the close of the given trading day in terms of points.

Largest daily point gains
Rank	Date	Close	Change	
Rank	Date	Close	Net	%
1	2025-04-09	5,456.90	+474.13	+9.52
2	2020-03-13	2,711.02	+230.38	+9.29
3	2020-03-24	2,447.33	+209.93	+9.38
4	2022-11-10	3,955.94	+207.80	+5.54
5	2026-03-31	6,528.52	+184.80	+2.91
6	2025-05-12	5,844.19	+184.28	+3.26
7	2020-04-06	2,663.68	+175.03	+7.03
8	2026-11-09	7,549.94	+173.08	+2.35
9	2026-04-08	6,783.48	+166.63	+2.52
10	2020-03-26	2,630.07	+154.51	+6.24
11	2024-11-06	5,929.04	+146.28	+2.53
12	2020-03-17	2,529.19	+143.06	+6.00
13	2026-08-04	7,736.52	+136.02	+1.79
14	2020-03-02	3,090.23	+136.01	+4.60
15	2020-03-10	2,882.23	+135.67	+4.94
16	2026-02-06	6,932.30	+133.90	+1.97
17	2025-04-22	5,287.76	+129.56	+2.51
18	2026-06-11	7,394.30	+127.31	+1.75
19	2020-03-04	3,130.12	+126.75	+4.22
20	2022-05-04	4,300.16	+124.69	+2.99

Largest daily point losses
Rank	Date	Close	Change	
Rank	Date	Close	Net	%
1	2026-11-05	7,353.73	−334.89	−4.36
2	2020-03-16	2,386.13	−324.89	−11.98
3	2025-04-04	5,074.08	−322.44	−5.97
4	2025-04-03	5,396.52	−274.45	−4.84
5	2026-11-20	6,910.39	−265.44	−3.70
6	2020-03-12	2,480.64	−260.74	−9.51
7	2020-03-09	2,746.56	−225.81	−7.60
8	2026-06-05	7,383.73	−200.59	−2.64
9	2025-04-10	5,268.05	−188.85	−3.46
10	2020-06-11	3,002.10	−188.04	−5.89
11	2025-10-10	6,552.51	−182.60	−2.71
12	2024-12-18	5,872.16	−178.45	−2.95
13	2022-09-13	3,932.69	−177.72	−4.32
14	2022-05-18	3,923.68	−165.17	−4.04
15	2024-08-05	5,186.33	−160.23	−3.00
16	2025-03-10	5,614.56	−155.64	−2.70
17	2022-04-29	4,131.93	−155.57	−3.63
18	2022-05-05	4,146.87	−153.30	−3.56
19	2022-06-13	3,749.63	−151.23	−3.88
20	2026-11-19	7,175.83	−147.80	−2.02

== Largest intraday point swings ==
Largest intraday point swings since 1967
Rank	Date	Close	Day high	Day low	Point swing	Net change
1	2025-04-09	5,456.90	5,481.34	4,948.43	532.91	+474.13
2	2025-04-07	5,062.25	5,246.57	4,835.04	411.53	−11.83
3	2025-04-08	4,982.77	5,267.47	4,910.42	357.05	−79.48
4	2026-11-05	7,353.73	7,681.29	7,350.35	330.94	−334.89
5	2026-11-20	6,910.39	7,198.67	6,882.66	316.01	−265.44
6	2026-06-09	7,386.65	7,483.15	7,237.85	245.30	−19.08
7	2026-11-19	7,175.83	7,415.64	7,173.63	242.01	−147.80
8	2025-04-10	5,268.05	5,353.15	5,115.27	237.88	−188.85
9	2025-11-20	6,538.76	6,770.35	6,534.05	236.30	−103.40
10	2025-04-04	5,074.08	5,292.14	5,069.90	222.24	−322.44
11	2020-03-13	2,711.02	2,711.33	2,492.37	218.96	+230.38
12	2025-10-10	6,552.51	6,762.40	6,550.78	211.62	−182.60
13	2024-12-18	5,872.17	6,070.67	5,867.79	202.88	−178.45
14	2022-01-24	4,410.13	4,417.35	4,222.62	194.73	+12.19
15	2022-10-13	3,669.91	3,685.41	3,491.58	193.83	+92.88
16	2020-03-17	2,529.19	2,553.93	2,367.04	186.89	+143.06
17	2020-03-12	2,480.64	2,660.95	2,478.86	182.09	−260.74
18	2020-03-16	2,386.13	2,562.98	2,380.94	182.04	−324.89
19	2025-03-03	5,849.72	5,986.09	5,810.91	175.18	−104.78
20	2026-03-09	6,795.99	6,810.44	6,636.04	174.40	+55.97

== Largest daily percentage changes each year ==
Largest daily percentage gains each year
Year	Date	Close	% Change	Weekday
2026*	2026-03-31	6,528.52	+2.91	Tuesday
2025	2025-04-09	5,456.90	+9.52	Wednesday
2024	2024-11-06	5,929.04	+2.53	Wednesday
2023	2023-01-06	3,895.08	+2.28	Friday
2022	2022-11-10	3,956.37	+5.54	Thursday
2021	2021-03-01	3,901.82	+2.38	Monday
2020	2020-03-24	2,447.33	+9.38	Tuesday
2019	2019-01-04	2,531.94	+3.43	Friday
2018	2018-12-26	2,467.70	+4.96	Wednesday
2017	2017-03-01	2,395.96	+1.37	Wednesday
2016	2016-01-29	1,940.24	+2.48	Friday
2015	2015-08-26	1,940.51	+3.90	Wednesday
2014	2014-12-18	2,061.23	+2.40	Thursday
2013	2013-01-02	1,462.42	+2.54	Wednesday
2012	2012-06-29	1,362.16	+2.49	Friday
2011	2011-08-09	1,172.53	+4.74	Tuesday
2010	2010-05-10	1,159.73	+4.40	Monday
2009	2009-03-23	822.92	+7.08	Monday
2008	2008-10-13	1,003.35	+11.58	Monday
2007	2007-09-18	1,519.78	+2.92	Tuesday
2006	2006-06-29	1,272.87	+2.16	Thursday
2005	2005-04-21	1,159.95	+1.97	Thursday
2004	2004-03-25	1,109.19	+1.64	Thursday
2003	2003-03-17	862.79	+3.54	Monday
2002	2002-07-24	843.43	+5.73	Wednesday
2001	2001-01-03	1,347.56	+5.01	Wednesday
2000	2000-03-16	1,458.47	+4.76	Thursday
1999	1999-10-28	1,342.44	+3.53	Thursday
1998	1998-09-08	1,023.46	+5.09	Tuesday
1997	1997-10-28	921.85	+5.12	Tuesday
1996	1996-12-19	745.76	+1.94	Thursday
1995	1995-05-31	533.40	+1.88	Wednesday
1994	1994-04-05	448.29	+2.13	Tuesday
1993	1993-03-08	454.71	+1.93	Monday
1992	1992-04-09	400.64	+1.56	Thursday
1991	1991-01-17	327.97	+3.73	Thursday
1990	1990-08-27	321.44	+3.19	Monday
1989	1989-10-16	342.85	+2.76	Monday
1988	1988-01-04	255.94	+3.59	Monday
1987	1987-10-21	258.38	+9.10	Wednesday
1986	1986-03-11	231.69	+2.26	Tuesday
1985	1985-01-21	175.23	+2.28	Monday
1984	1984-08-03	162.35	+2.76	Friday
1983	1983-07-20	169.29	+2.71	Wednesday
1982	1982-08-17	109.04	+4.76	Tuesday
1981	1981-03-12	133.19	+2.49	Thursday
1980	1980-04-22	103.43	+3.64	Tuesday
1979	1979-09-20	110.51	+2.06	Thursday
1978	1978-11-01	96.85	+3.97	Wednesday
1977	1977-11-10	94.71	+1.86	Thursday
1976	1976-01-05	92.58	+1.85	Monday
1975	1975-01-27	75.37	+3.27	Monday
1974	1974-10-09	67.82	+4.60	Wednesday
1973	1973-12-26	95.74	+3.06	Wednesday
1972	1972-09-27	109.66	+1.42	Wednesday
1971	1971-08-16	98.76	+3.21	Monday
1970	1970-05-27	72.77	+5.02	Wednesday
1969	1969-07-31	91.83	+2.11	Thursday
1968	1968-04-01	92.48	+2.53	Monday
1967	1967-06-06	90.23	+2.04	Tuesday
1966	1966-10-12	77.04	+2.84	Wednesday
1965	1965-06-30	84.12	+2.07	Wednesday
1964	1964-05-01	80.17	+0.89	Friday
1963	1963-11-26	72.38	+3.98	Tuesday
1962	1962-05-29	58.08	+4.65	Tuesday
1961	1961-04-17	68.68	+3.48	Monday
1960	1960-04-06	56.51	+2.06	Wednesday
1959	1959-02-19	55.50	+2.21	Thursday
1958	1958-11-26	51.90	+1.72	Wednesday
1957	1957-10-23	40.73	+4.49	Wednesday
1956	1956-09-14	47.21	+2.43	Friday
1955	1955-07-06	43.18	+3.57	Wednesday
1954	1954-12-17	35.92	+2.83	Friday
1953	1953-09-22	23.20	+1.40	Tuesday
1952	1952-05-02	23.56	+1.68	Friday
1951	1951-07-05	21.64	+1.93	Thursday
1950	1950-12-18	19.85	+2.69	Monday

Largest daily percentage losses each year
Year	Date	Close	% Change	Weekday
2026*	2026-11-05	7,353.73	−4.36	Thursday
2025	2025-04-04	5,074.08	−5.97	Friday
2024	2024-08-05	5,186.33	−3.00	Monday
2023	2023-02-21	3,997.34	−2.00	Tuesday
2022	2022-09-13	3,932.69	−4.32	Tuesday
2021	2021-01-27	3,750.77	−2.57	Wednesday
2020	2020-03-16	2,386.13	−11.98	Monday
2019	2019-08-05	2,844.74	−2.98	Monday
2018	2018-02-05	2,648.94	−4.10	Monday
2017	2017-05-17	2,357.03	−1.82	Wednesday
2016	2016-06-24	2,037.41	−3.59	Friday
2015	2015-08-24	1,893.21	−3.94	Monday
2014	2014-02-03	1,741.89	−2.28	Monday
2013	2013-06-20	1,588.19	−2.50	Thursday
2012	2012-06-01	1,278.04	−2.46	Friday
2011	2011-08-08	1,119.46	−6.66	Monday
2010	2010-05-20	1,071.59	−3.90	Thursday
2009	2009-01-20	805.22	−5.28	Tuesday
2008	2008-10-15	907.84	−9.03	Wednesday
2007	2007-02-27	1,399.04	−3.47	Tuesday
2006	2006-01-20	1,261.49	−1.83	Friday
2005	2005-04-15	1,142.62	−1.67	Friday
2004	2004-08-05	1,080.70	−1.63	Thursday
2003	2003-03-24	864.23	−3.52	Monday
2002	2002-09-03	878.02	−4.15	Tuesday
2001	2001-09-17	1,038.77	−4.92	Monday
2000	2000-04-14	1,356.56	−5.83	Friday
1999	1999-10-15	1,247.41	−2.81	Friday
1998	1998-08-31	957.28	−6.80	Monday
1997	1997-10-27	876.99	−6.87	Monday
1996	1996-03-08	633.50	−3.08	Friday
1995	1995-12-18	606.81	−1.55	Monday
1994	1994-02-04	469.81	−2.27	Friday
1993	1993-02-16	433.91	−2.40	Tuesday
1992	1992-04-07	398.06	−1.86	Tuesday
1991	1991-11-15	382.62	−3.66	Friday
1990	1990-08-06	334.43	−3.02	Monday
1989	1989-10-13	333.65	−6.12	Friday
1988	1988-01-08	243.40	−6.77	Friday
1987	1987-10-19	224.84	−20.47	Monday
1986	1986-09-11	235.18	−4.81	Thursday
1985	1985-07-29	189.60	−1.46	Monday
1984	1984-02-08	155.85	−1.82	Wednesday
1983	1983-01-24	139.97	−2.70	Monday
1982	1982-10-25	133.32	−3.97	Monday
1981	1981-08-24	125.50	−2.89	Monday
1980	1980-03-17	102.26	−3.01	Monday
1979	1979-10-09	106.63	−2.96	Tuesday
1978	1978-10-31	93.15	−2.01	Tuesday
1977	1977-07-27	98.64	−1.63	Wednesday
1976	1976-05-24	99.44	−1.80	Monday
1975	1975-03-24	81.42	−2.36	Monday
1974	1974-11-18	69.27	−3.67	Monday
1973	1973-11-19	100.71	−3.05	Monday
1972	1972-05-09	104.74	−1.32	Tuesday
1971	1971-06-18	98.97	−1.52	Friday
1970	1970-05-25	70.25	−2.77	Monday
1969	1969-07-28	90.21	−2.01	Monday
1968	1968-03-14	88.32	−1.90	Thursday
1967	1967-10-31	93.30	−1.57	Tuesday
1966	1966-08-29	74.53	−2.46	Monday
1965	1965-06-02	87.09	−1.84	Wednesday
1964	1964-08-04	81.96	−1.25	Tuesday
1963	1963-11-22	69.61	−2.81	Friday
1962	1962-05-28	55.50	−6.68	Monday
1961	1961-04-18	66.20	−3.61	Tuesday
1960	1960-09-19	53.86	−2.27	Monday
1959	1959-08-10	58.62	−2.09	Monday
1958	1958-11-25	51.02	−1.94	Tuesday
1957	1957-10-21	39.15	−2.93	Monday
1956	1956-09-13	46.09	−2.04	Thursday
1955	1955-09-26	42.61	−6.62	Monday
1954	1954-06-08	28.34	−2.24	Tuesday
1953	1953-02-09	25.69	−3.09	Monday
1952	1952-10-15	24.06	−1.72	Wednesday
1951	1951-10-22	22.75	−2.44	Monday
1950	1950-06-26	18.11	−5.38	Monday

== See also ==
- S&P 500
- List of largest daily changes in the Dow Jones Industrial Average
- List of largest daily changes in the Nasdaq Composite
- List of largest daily changes in the Russell 2000
