= October 27, 1997, mini-crash =

Global stock market crash during the 1997 Asian financial crisis

On October 27, 1997, a global stock market crash was caused by the 1997 economic crisis in Asia, the "Asian contagion", or Tom Yum Goong crisis (Thai: วิกฤตต้มยำกุ้ง). The point loss that the Dow Jones Industrial Average suffered on this day currently ranks as the 18th biggest percentage loss since the Dow's creation in 1896. This crash is considered a "mini-crash" because the percentage loss was relatively small compared to some other notable crashes. After the crash, the markets still remained positive for 1997, but the "mini-crash" may be considered as the beginning of the end of the 1990s economic boom in the United States and Canada, as both consumer confidence and economic growth were mildly reduced during the winter of 1997–1998 (with neither being strongly affected, compared to the rest of the world), and when both returned to pre-October levels, they began to grow at an even slower pace than before the crash.

== The crash ==
The crash started overnight in Asia as Hong Kong's Hang Seng Index fell 6%, although the most widely watched Asian market, Japan's Nikkei 225, only fell 2% on the day. The losses spread to the European markets, where London's FTSE 100 Index fell 98.90 points, or just about 2%, to 4,871.30. The Frankfurt DAX index fell sharply as well. The U.S. markets were widely expected to open lower for the day. The Dow, NASDAQ Composite and S&P 500 all declined for the entire session. At 2:36 pm, after falling 350 points, the Dow hit its first trading curb halt, which lasted 30 minutes. After that, stocks continued their immense slide, eventually hitting the second trading curb at 550 points, and trading ended at 3:30 pm. The second trading curb usually halts trading for one hour, but since there were only 30 minutes left in the session, the New York Stock Exchange simply ended trading early. Nasdaq trading continued until 4:00 p.m.

== By the numbers ==
=== Controversial halts ===
The decision of the NYSE to end trading early was controversial. Since the Dow hit the first trading curb at 350 points, its loss was only 4.54%. This was not nearly enough to justify halting trading, given that the Dow had fallen more than 4.5% in 11 different sessions between 1945 and 1997. Currently, the New York Stock Exchange sets the curbs at 10%, 20% and 30%, and determines how much these percentages are in point terms by where the Dow finishes at the end of the quarter.

=== Closing time ===
By the end of the day, the Dow Jones Industrial Average fell 554.26 points, or 7.18%, to 7,161.15. Back then, this was the 12th biggest percentage loss and 3rd biggest point loss on record. The Nasdaq Composite fell 7%, or 115.41, to 1,535.51. The S&P 500 fell 64.63, or 6.86%, to 877.01. Several stock market analysts saw this crash as a "correction" to the overheated markets, which had doubled in value in 30 months. This crash put the Dow down 13.3% from its then-record high of 8,259.31 on August 6, but it still gained for the year.

Volume also hit a record high. New York Stock Exchange volume topped 695 million shares, breaking the previous record of 684 million shares traded on January 23, 1997. Today, this volume is considered to be very low. $663 billion in market capitalization was wiped out.

== October 28 ==
U.S. stock markets were widely expected to open lower for October 28 because the Asian markets fell even more than they had on the 27th. Hong Kong's Hang Seng Index declined a staggering 14%. The Nikkei fell 4.26%. The U.S. stock markets initially continued their drop from the 27th but abruptly stabilized and began to climb. The Dow fell as many as 186 points by 10:06 am, and soon thereafter a rally started. By 10:20 am, the Dow was down only 25 points. Five minutes later, the Dow jumped back into positive territory and was up 50 points. Nine minutes later, at 10:34 am, the Dow made a triple-digit gain of 137.27 points. Stock prices continued to soar in choppy trading throughout the rest of the day.

At the close of trading at 4:00 pm, the Dow finished with a then-record 337.17 point gain (recovering 61% of the previous day's loss) to close at 7,498.32. The market restored $384 billion of the $663 billion in market capitalization lost the previous day, and 1 billion shares were traded on the New York Stock Exchange for the first time ever, with a volume of 1.21 billion shares. Currently, the volume is considered very low. The Nasdaq Composite also made a record gain on record volume by gaining 67.93 points to 1,603.02 and saw its first-ever 1-billion share day, with a volume of 1.23 billion shares.

== Other massive losses and sharp rebounds ==
This was not the first time the market had large losses followed by a sharp recovery. Here are a few other instances:

- Stock Market Crash of 1929: The Dow falls a total of 23% for October 28 and 29; then makes a sharp 12.84% rebound on the October 30. However, over the next several years the stock market fell dramatically.
- October 13 and 16, 1989 – The Dow plunges 190.58 points, or 6.9%, on October 13, 1989 then rebounds 88 points on the 16th.
- Black Monday, October 19–20, 1987: The Dow suffers the biggest percentage loss in recorded stock market history on October 19 and initially continues its plunge on the 20th. The markets rally sharply in the afternoon and the Dow posts its first triple-digit gain in its history.
- 2010 Flash Crash, May 6, 2010: It started at 2:32 pm EDT and lasted for 36 minutes.
