= List of largest daily changes in the Dow Jones Industrial Average =

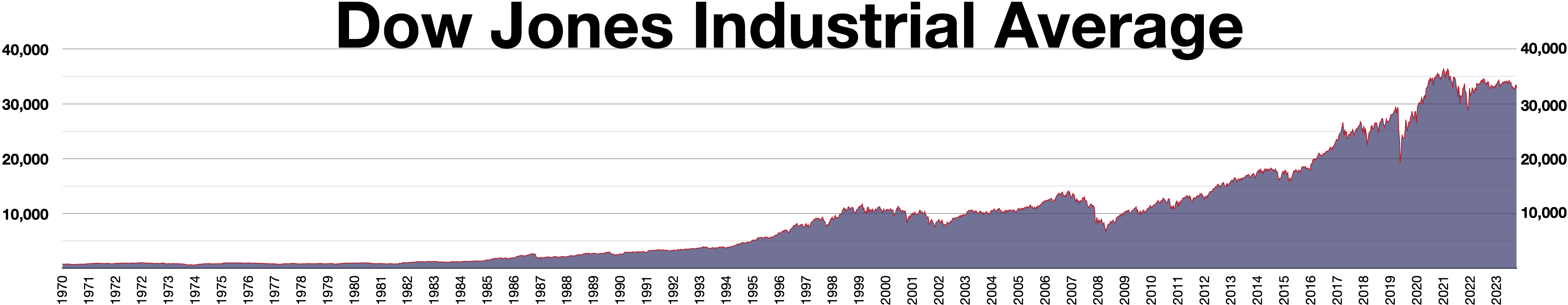
Dow Jones Industrial Average 1970–2022

This is a list of the largest daily changes in the Dow Jones Industrial Average from 1896. Compare to the list of largest daily changes in the S&P 500 Index.

== Largest percentage changes ==
The first four tables show only the largest one-day changes between a given day's close and the close of the previous trading day, not the largest changes during the trading day (i.e. intraday changes).

Some sources (including the file Highlights/Lowlights of The Dow on the Dow Jones website) show a loss of −24.39% (from 71.42 to 54.00) on December 12, 1914, placing that day atop the list of largest percentage losses. The New York Stock Exchange reopened that day following a nearly four-and-a-half-month closure since July 30, 1914, and the Dow in fact rose 4.4% that day (from 71.42 to 74.56). However, the apparent decline was due to a later 1916 revision of the Dow Jones Industrial Average, which retroactively adjusted the values following the closure but not those before, and it represents the only discontinuity in the index's history rather than an actual loss.

Largest daily percentage gains

#	Date	Close	Change	
#	Date	Close	Net	%
1	1933-03-15	62.10	+8.26	+15.34
2	1931-10-06	99.34	+12.86	+14.87
3	1929-10-30	258.47	+28.40	+12.34
4	2020-03-24	20,704.91	+2,112.98	+11.37
5	1932-09-21	75.16	+7.67	+11.36
6	2008-10-13	9,387.61	+936.42	+11.08
7	2008-10-28	9,065.12	+889.35	+10.88
8	1987-10-21	2,027.85	+186.84	+10.15
9	1932-08-03	58.22	+5.06	+9.52
10	1932-02-11	78.60	+6.80	+9.47
11	2020-03-13	23,185.62	+1,985.00	+9.36
12	1929-11-14	217.28	+18.59	+9.36
13	1931-12-18	80.69	+6.90	+9.35
14	1932-02-13	85.82	+7.22	+9.19
15	1932-05-06	59.01	+4.91	+9.08
16	1933-04-19	68.31	+5.66	+9.03
17	1931-10-08	105.79	+8.47	+8.70
18	1932-06-10	48.94	+3.62	+7.99
19	2025-04-09	40,608.45	+2,962.86	+7.87
20	2020-04-06	22,679.99	+1,627.46	+7.73

Largest daily percentage losses

#	Date	Close	Change	
#	Date	Close	Net	%
1	1987-10-19	1,738.74	−508.00	−22.61
2	2020-03-16	20,188.52	−2,997.10	−12.93
3	1929-10-28	260.64	−38.33	−12.82
4	1929-10-29	230.07	−30.57	−11.73
5	2020-03-12	21,200.62	−2,352.60	−9.99
6	1929-11-06	232.13	−25.55	−9.92
7	1899-12-18	58.27	−5.57	−8.72
8	1932-08-12	63.11	−5.79	−8.40
9	1907-03-14	76.23	−6.89	−8.29
10	1987-10-26	1,793.93	−156.83	−8.04
11	2008-10-15	8,577.91	−733.08	−7.87
12	1933-07-21	88.71	−7.55	−7.84
13	2020-03-09	23,851.02	−2,013.76	−7.79
14	1937-10-18	125.73	−10.57	−7.75
15	2008-12-01	8,149.09	−679.95	−7.70
16	2008-10-09	8,579.19	−678.91	−7.33
17	1917-02-01	88.52	−6.91	−7.24
18	1997-10-27	7,161.14	−554.26	−7.18
19	1932-10-05	66.07	−5.09	−7.15
20	2001-09-17	8,920.70	−684.81	−7.13

== Largest point changes ==
The Dow Jones Industrial Average was first published in 1896, but since the firms listed at that time were in existence before then, the index can be calculated going back to May 2, 1881. A loss of just over 24 percent on May 5, 1893, from 39.90 to 30.02 signaled the apex of the stock effects of the Panic of 1893; the 2008 financial crisis was a 61.8 percent retracement thereof that began on October 11, 2007, and lasted until the closing low on March 9, 2009.

The largest point drop in history occurred on March 16, 2020, when concerns over the ongoing COVID-19 pandemic engulfed the market, dropping the Dow Jones Industrial Average 2,997 points. The largest point gain (+2,963) occurred on April 9, 2025. As of April 9, 2025, two of the top three greatest point drops and two of the top three greatest point gains were amid the 2020 stock market crash, which was marked by extreme point swings.

Largest daily point gains

#	Date	Close	Change		Ref
#	Date	Close	Net	%	Ref
1	2025-04-09	40,608.45	+2,962.86	+7.87	
2	2020-03-24	20,704.91	+2,112.98	+11.37	
3	2020-03-13	23,185.62	+1,985.00	+9.36	
4	2020-04-06	22,679.99	+1,627.46	+7.73	
5	2026-11-04	53,356.12	+1,569.40	+3.03	
6	2024-11-06	43,729.93	+1,508.05	+3.57	
7	2020-03-26	22,552.17	+1,351.62	+6.38	
8	2026-04-08	47,909.92	+1,325.46	+2.85	
9	2020-03-02	26,703.32	+1,293.96	+5.09	
10	2026-02-06	50,115.67	+1,206.95	+2.47	
11	2022-11-10	33,715.37	+1,201.43	+3.70	
12	2020-03-04	27,090.86	+1,173.45	+4.53	
13	2020-03-10	25,018.16	+1,167.14	+4.89	
14	2025-05-12	42,410.10	+1,160.72	+2.81	
15	2026-03-31	46,341.51	+1,125.37	+2.49	
16	2026-11-09	52,389.75	+1,104.02	+2.15	
17	2018-12-26	22,878.45	+1,086.25	+4.98	
18	2020-03-17	21,237.38	+1,048.86	+5.20	
19	2025-04-22	39,186.98	+1,016.57	+2.66	
20	2008-10-13	9,387.61	+936.42	+11.08	

Largest daily point losses

#	Date	Close	Change		Ref
#	Date	Close	Net	%	Ref
1	2020-03-16	20,188.52	−2,997.10	−12.93	
2	2020-03-12	21,200.62	−2,352.60	−9.99	
3	2025-04-04	38,314.86	−2,231.07	−5.50	
4	2020-03-09	23,851.02	−2,013.76	−7.79	
5	2020-06-11	25,128.17	−1,861.82	−6.90	
6	2026-11-05	51,523.06	−1,833.06	−3.44	
7	2025-04-03	40,545.93	−1,679.39	−3.98	
8	2020-03-11	23,553.22	−1,464.94	−5.90	
9	2020-03-18	19,898.92	−1,338.46	−6.30	
10	2022-09-13	31,104.97	−1,276.37	−3.94	
11	2020-02-27	25,766.64	−1,190.95	−4.42	
12	2018-02-05	24,345.75	−1,175.21	−4.60	
13	2022-05-18	31,490.07	−1,164.52	−3.57	
14	2026-07-29	51,594.14	−1,153.18	−2.19	
15	2024-12-18	42,326.87	−1,123.03	−2.58	
16	2026-11-19	49,097.06	−1,101.11	−2.19	
17	2022-05-05	32,997.97	−1,063.09	−3.12	
18	2024-08-05	38,703.27	−1,033.99	−2.60	
19	2018-02-08	23,860.46	−1,032.89	−4.15	
20	2020-02-24	27,960.80	−1,031.61	−3.56	

== Largest intraday point swings ==
A point swing is the difference between the intraday high and the intraday low. (The intraday high may not be the same as the opening price; for instance, in the 2010 flash crash, the market reached an intraday high, higher than the opening price.)

This is distinguished from an intraday point drop or gain, which is the difference between the opening price and the intraday low or high.

This table shows the largest intraday point swings since 1987. As the "Net Change" column shows, 13 of these 20 largest intraday swings occurred during days on which the Dow declined, and 7 occurred during days on which it advanced. None of the top 20 occurred before the year 2018.

During the 2020 stock market crash, fourteen of the top seventeen positions occurred in the month of March 2020.

#	Date	Close	Day high	Day low	Point swing	Net change
1	2025-04-09	40,608.45	40,778.70	37,275.69	3,503.01	+2,962.86
1	2025-04-07	37,965.60	39,207.02	36,611.78	2,595.24	−349.26
2	2025-04-08	37,645.59	39,426.60	37,103.86	2,322.74	−320.01
3	2026-11-05	51,523.06	53,710.61	51,486.82	2,223.79	−1,833.06
4	2020-03-13	23,185.62	23,189.76	21,285.37	1,904.39	+1,985.00
5	2025-04-04	38,314.86	40,097.90	38,264.87	1,833.03	−2,231.07
6	2020-03-12	21,200.62	22,837.95	21,154.46	1,683.49	−2,352.60
7	2020-03-16	20,188.52	21,768.28	20,116.46	1,651.82	−2,997.10
8	2018-02-05	24,345.75	25,520.53	23,923.88	1,596.65	−1,175.21
9	2020-03-18	19,898.92	20,489.33	18,917.46	1,571.87	−1,338.46
10	2025-04-10	39,593.66	39,996.93	38,427.70	1,569.23	−1,014.79
11	2022-10-13	30,038.72	30,168.54	28,660.94	1,507.60	+827.87
12	2020-03-17	21,237.38	21,379.35	19,882.26	1,497.09	+1,048.86
13	2020-03-25	21,200.55	22,019.93	20,538.34	1,481.59	+495.64
14	2020-03-20	20,253.15	20,531.26	19,094.27	1,436.99	−913.21
15	2024-12-18	42,326.87	43,688.97	42,300.04	1,388.93	−1,123.03
16	2020-03-03	25,917.41	27,084.59	25,706.28	1,378.31	−785.91
17	2020-03-10	25,018.16	25,020.99	23,690.34	1,330.65	+1,167.14
18	2020-03-02	26,703.32	26,706.17	25,391.96	1,314.21	+1,293.96
19	2020-03-09	23,851.02	24,992.36	23,706.07	1,286.29	−1,141.34
20	2020-03-11	23,553.22	24,604.63	23,328.32	1,276.31	−1,464.94

== Largest intraday point changes ==
This is distinguished from a point swing, which is defined as the difference between the intraday high and the intraday low. The previous day close is used to calculate the net change.

Largest intraday point gains

An intraday point gain is defined as the difference between the opening price (which may or may not be the intraday low) and the intraday high. Such records that turned negative are also recorded in a separate list. The opening price is used to calculate the point gain.

Date	Open	Day high	Point gain	Net change
2025-04-09	37,387.91	40,778.70	3,390.79	+2,962.86
2022-10-13	28,755.83	30,168.54	1,412.71	+827.87
2025-04-07	37,879.65	39,207.02	1,327.37	−349.26
2020-03-13	21,973.82	23,189.76	1,215.94	+1,985.00
2026-02-06	49,032.19	50,169.65	1,137.46	+1,206.95
2020-03-26	21,468.38	22,595.06	1,126.68	+1,351.62
2020-03-02	25,590.51	26,706.17	1,115.66	+1,293.96
2020-04-06	21,693.63	22,783.45	1,089.82	+1,627.46
2026-11-04	54,210.23	53,492.40	1,082.17	+1,569.40
2018-12-26	21,857.73	22,878.92	1,021.19	+1,086.25
2020-03-24	19,722.19	20,737.70	1,015.51	+2,112.98
2026-06-11	49,972.07	50,968.95	996.88	+929.97
2020-03-25	21,050.34	22,019.93	969.59	+495.64
2008-10-13	8,462.42	9,427.99	965.57	+936.42
2026-11-09	51,643.01	52,574.34	931.33	+1,104.02
2026-04-17	48,788.81	49,717.98	929.17	+868.71
2025-04-11	39,493.42	40,404.27	910.85	+619.05
2008-10-28	8,178.72	9,082.08	903.36	+889.35
2020-03-17	20,487.05	21,379.35	892.30	+1,048.86
2018-02-06	24,085.17	24,946.23	861.06	+567.02

Largest intraday point drops

An intraday point drop is defined as the difference between the opening price (which may or may not be the intraday high) and the intraday low. Such records that turned positive are also recorded in a separate list. The opening price is used to calculate the point drop.

Date	Open	Day low	Point drop	Net change
2026-11-05	53,679.01	51,486.82	2,192.19	−1,833.06
2025-04-04	40,097.90	38,264.87	1,833.03	−2,231.07
2025-04-08	38,827.10	37,103.86	1,723.24	−320.01
2025-04-10	39,996.93	38,427.70	1,569.23	−1,014.79
2018-02-05	25,337.87	23,923.88	1,413.99	−1,175.21
2020-03-09	24,992.36	23,706.07	1,286.29	−2,013.76
2020-03-11	24,604.63	23,328.32	1,276.31	−1,464.94
2020-03-18	20,188.69	18,917.46	1,271.23	−1,338.46
2025-04-07	37,879.65	36,611.78	1,267.87	−349.26
2020-06-11	26,282.51	25,082.72	1,199.79	−1,861.82
2022-05-05	33,854.17	32,685.10	1,169.07	−1,063.09
2024-12-18	43,459.72	42,300.04	1,159.68	−1,123.03
2020-03-20	20,253.15	19,094.27	1,158.88	−913.21
2026-07-29	52,674.21	51,594.14	1,123.03	−1,153.18
2015-08-24	16,459.75	15,370.33	1,089.42	−588.40
2025-04-21	38,906.04	37,830.66	1,075.38	−971.82
2022-05-18	32,468.67	31,393.95	1,074.72	−1164.52
2020-03-03	26,762.47	25,706.28	1,056.19	−785.91
2018-02-08	24,902.30	23,849.23	1,053.07	−1,032.89
2020-02-25	28,037.65	26,997.62	1,040.03	−879.44

== Largest intraday point changes with turnovers ==
Largest intraday point gains that turned negative

These are the largest intraday point gains that closed in negative territory at the end of the trading session. In order to be considered an intraday point gain, the intraday high must be above the previous day closing price, while the opening price is used to calculate intraday highs.

Date	Open	Day high	Close	Highest points
2025-04-07	37,879.65	39,207.02	37,965.60	1,327.37
2025-04-08	38,827.10	39,426.60	37,645.59	599.50
2026-03-13	46,689.24	47,123.99	46,558.47	434.75
2015-08-25	15,882.27	16,312.94	15,666.44	430.67
2008-10-14	9,388.97	9,794.37	9,310.99	405.40
2018-02-07	24,892.87	25,293.96	24,893.35	400.13
2020-02-26	27,159.46	27,542.78	26,957.59	383.32
2018-12-21	22,871.74	23,254.59	22,445.37	382.85
2018-12-19	23,693.33	24,057.34	23,323.66	364.01
2008-10-10	8,568.67	8,901.28	8,451.19	332.61
2020-03-03	26,762.47	27,084.59	25,917.41	322.12
2025-10-15	8,975.35	9,281.12	8,852.22	318.17
2008-10-03	10,483.96	10,796.26	10,325.38	312.30
2008-10-17	46,375.17	46,693.34	46,253.31	305.77
2008-10-29	9,062.33	9,363.32	8,990.96	300.99
2019-08-01	26,879.86	27,175.59	26,583.42	295.73
2026-02-03	49,358.59	49,653.13	49,240.99	294.54
2018-02-21	24,988.06	25,267.99	24,797.78	279.93
2020-03-20	20,253.15	20,531.26	19,173.98	278.11
2015-01-13	17,645.02	17,923.01	17,613.68	277.99

Largest intraday point losses that turned positive

These are the largest intraday point losses that closed in positive territory at the end of the trading session. In order to be considered an intraday point loss, the intraday low must be below the previous day closing price, while the opening price is used to calculate intraday lows.

Date	Open	Day low	Close	Lowest points
2022-01-24	34,070.61	33,150.33	34,364.50	920.28
2020-03-10	24,453.00	23,690.34	25,018.16	762.66
2026-03-09	47,371.28	46,615.52	47,740.80	755.76
2020-03-19	19,830.01	19,177.13	20,087.19	652.88
2024-09-11	40,638.76	39,993.07	40,861.71	645.69
2018-02-09	23,992.67	23,360.29	24,190.90	632.38
2020-03-17	20,487.05	19,882.26	21,237.38	604.79
2026-06-09	50,814.42	50,211.12	50,872.11	603.30
2020-06-12	25,659.42	25,078.41	25,605.54	581.01
2025-04-30	40,290.41	39,745.63	40,669.36	544.78
2020-03-25	21,050.34	20,538.34	21,200.55	512.00
2018-12-10	24,360.95	23,881.37	24,423.26	479.58
2025-10-14	45,871.89	45,452.03	46,270.46	419.86
2018-10-12	25,407.63	25,000.83	25,339.99	406.80
2008-10-16	8,577.04	8,197.67	8,979.26	379.37
2018-12-27	22,629.06	22,267.42	23,138.82	361.64
2026-01-29	48,938.27	48,597.22	49,071.56	341.05
1987-10-20	1,949.77	1,616.21	1,841.01	333.56
2020-04-16	23,543.66	23,211.38	23,537.68	332.28
2008-01-23	11,969.08	11,644.81	12,270.17	324.27

== See also ==
- Closing milestones of the Dow Jones Industrial Average
- List of largest daily changes in the S&P 500 Index
- List of largest daily changes in the Nasdaq Composite
- List of stock market crashes and bear markets
- Stock market crashes in India
