= Black Monday (2011) =

Global stock market crash

In finance and investing, Black Monday 2011 refers to August 8, 2011, when US and global stock markets crashed following the Friday night credit rating downgrade by Standard and Poor's of the United States sovereign debt from AAA, or "risk free", to AA+. It was the first time in history the United States was downgraded. Moody's issued a report during morning trading which said their AAA rating of U.S. credit was in jeopardy, this came after issuing a negative outlook in the previous week.

The NASDAQ Composite Index fell 6.9%, the S&P 500 Index fell 6.65%, and the New York Stock Exchange fell 7.05%. The NASDAQ Composite Index ended the day at a session low.

== U.S. Presidential reaction ==
U.S. President Barack Obama attempted to calm the markets during trading in a speech from the White House, but the DOW lost 200 more points within 20 minutes of it concluding.

== Relationship to United States debt ceiling crisis ==
The United States debt ceiling crisis was a financial crisis that started as a political and economic debate over increasing the statutory limit of US federal government borrowing. The limit of the indebtedness of the government of the United States is also known as the debt ceiling. In the run up to the crisis, the United States had approached, and actually passed, this limit.

Since the United States Department of the Treasury has no authority to issue or incur debt beyond the debt ceiling set by the United States Congress, failure to reach an agreement between the necessary members of the government to raise the debt ceiling meant that certain debts would not be paid, and this would potentially affect the government's ability to borrow quickly or at low cost, due to a perception of increased risk in loaning money to the US government. If the debt ceiling were not raised by August 2, 2011, either government spending would have to be decreased, or debt would have to be paid later than promised, also known as a default.

The debate was contentious, with nearly all Republican legislators opposing any increase in taxes and the large majority of Democratic legislators viewing tax increases as necessary along with spending cuts. Supporters of the Tea Party movement pushed Republicans to reject any agreement that failed to incorporate large and immediate spending cuts or a completed balanced-budget constitutional amendment.

The immediate crisis of 2011 ended when a complex deal imposing limits on both debt and government spending was reached on July 31. After the legislation was passed by both the House and Senate, President Barack Obama signed the Budget Control Act of 2011 into law on August 2, the day of the deadline. However, because of the political upheaval caused and the perception by powerful credit ratings agencies that the United States government could not effectively manage its large debt positions, the largely anticipated positive effects that the debt deal would have on the markets never came to fruition. Instead, following the downgrading of US sovereign debt, as well as the Fannie Mae and Freddie Mac government-backed lenders by Standard and Poor's from a AAA to a AA+ rating, the global stock markets experienced a prolonged period of heightened selling activity ultimately resulting in the crash of Black Monday 2011.

== See also ==
- Black Monday (1987)
- Wall Street crash of 1929
- 2010 Flash Crash
- List of largest daily changes in the Dow Jones Industrial Average
