= 1973–1974 stock market crash =

The 1973–1974 stock market crash caused a bear market between January 1973 and December 1974. Affecting all the major stock markets in the world, particularly the United Kingdom, it was one of the worst stock market downturns since the Great Depression, the other being the 2008 financial crisis. The crash came after the collapse of the Bretton Woods system over the previous two years, with the associated 'Nixon Shock' and United States dollar devaluation under the Smithsonian Agreement. It was compounded by the outbreak of the 1973 oil crisis. It was a major event of the 1970s recession.

All the main stock indices of the future G7 bottomed out between September and December 1974, having lost at least 34% of their value in nominal terms and 43% in real terms. The recovery was a slow process. West Germany's market was the fastest to recover, returning to the same level by June 1985. The United Kingdom returned to the same market level by May 1987, but this full recovery lasted for only a few months and ended with the Black Monday crash of 1987. The United States returned to the same market level by August 1993, over twenty years after the 1973–74 crash began.

== History ==
In the 694 days between 11 January 1973 and 6 December 1974, the New York Stock Exchange's Dow Jones Industrial Average benchmark suffered the seventh-worst bear market in its history, losing over 45% of its value. The year 1972 had been a good year for the DJIA, with gains of 15% in the twelve months, and 1973 had been expected to be even better, with Time magazine reporting just 3 days before the crash began that it was 'shaping up as a gilt-edged year'. In the two years from 1972 to 1974, the American economy slowed from 7.2% real GDP growth to −2.1% contraction, while inflation (by CPI) jumped from 3.4% in 1972 to 12.3% in 1974. The Dow reached its lowest level, 577.60 points, on December 6, 1974.

The effect was worse in the United Kingdom, particularly on the London Stock Exchange's FT 30, which lost 73% of its value during the crash. From a rate of 5.1% real GDP growth in 1972, the UK went into recession in 1974, with GDP falling by 1.1%. At the time, the UK's property market was going through a major crisis, and a secondary banking crisis forced the Bank of England to bail out a number of lenders. In the United Kingdom, the crash ended after the rent freeze was lifted on 19 December 1974, allowing a readjustment of property prices; over the following year, stock prices rose by 150%. The definitive market low for the FT30 Index (a forerunner of the FTSE100 today) came on 6 January 1975, when the index closed at 146 (having reached a nadir of 145.8 intra-day). The market then practically doubled in just over 3 months. However, unlike in the United States, inflation continued to rise, to 25% in 1975, giving way to the era of stagflation. The Hong Kong Hang Seng Index also fell from 1,800 in early 1973 to close to 300.

== Large daily price changes ==
Out of the 20 largest percentage gains and losses in the DJIA, none occurred during this time period.

== Aftermath ==
All the main stock indices of the future G7 bottomed out between September and December 1974, having lost at least 34% of their value in nominal terms and 43% in real terms. In all cases, the recovery was a slow process. Although West Germany's market was the fastest to recover, returning to the original nominal level within eighteen months, it did not return to the same real level until June 1985. The United Kingdom did not return to the same market level until May 1987 (only a few months before the Black Monday crash), whilst the United States did not see the same level in real terms until August 1993, over twenty years after the 1973–74 crash began.

== Cultural references ==
The Hong Kong TVB series The Greed of Man storyline revolves around the market crash.

== See also ==
- Stock market crashes in Hong Kong
- Nifty Fifty
- 1973–1975 recession
