= 2015–2016 stock market selloff =

Stock market selloff of 2015-2016

The 2015–2016 stock market selloff was the period of decline in the value of stock prices globally that occurred between June 2015 to June 2016. It included the 2015–2016 Chinese stock market turbulence, in which the SSE Composite Index fell 43% in just over two months between June 2015 and August 2015, which culminated in the devaluation of the yuan. Investors sold shares globally as a result of slowing growth in the GDP of China, a fall in petroleum prices, the Greek debt default in June 2015, the effects of the end of quantitative easing in the United States in October 2014, a sharp rise in bond yields in early 2016, and finally, in June 2016, the 2016 United Kingdom European Union membership referendum, in which Brexit was voted upon.

By July 2016, the Dow Jones Industrial Average (DJIA) recovered and achieved record highs. The FTSE 100 Index did not do so until later in 2016.

== Stock market performance in mid-2015 ==
The DJIA closed at a record 18,312 on May 19, 2015, before slowly falling to a low of 17,504 and then partially recovering to its secondary closing peak of 18,102 on July 16.

The stock market slowly slid thereafter, reaching a low of 17,403. The NASDAQ Composite peaked on July 17, 2015, at 5,219. Apple Inc.'s stock peaked at $133.00 on February 20, 2015, reached $132.37 on July 20, 2015, and slid to $105 by August 21, 2015.

== The downturns ==
=== Initial decline and bounce back in 2015 ===
On August 18, 2015, the Dow Jones Industrial Average (DJIA) fell 33 points. On August 19, 2015, it lost 0.93% and on August 20, 2015, it lost 2.06%. A steep selloff then occurred on August 21, 2015, when the DJIA fell 531 points (3.12%), bringing the 3-day loss to 1,300 points.

On Monday, August 24, world stock markets were down substantially, wiping out all gains made in 2015, with interlinked drops in commodities such as oil, which hit a six-year price low, copper, and most of Asian currencies, but the Japanese Yen, losing value against the United States Dollar. With the stock market plunge on Monday, an estimated ten trillion dollars had been wiped off the books on global markets since June 3.

The 8% drop in China on August 24 was termed "Black Monday" by the Chinese state media. The term gained wide usage in the next 48 hours.

In India, the Sensex recorded its biggest single-day fall of 1,624.51 points on August 24, ending the day down 5.94%. Indian investors registered losses worth over ₹7 lakh crore (₹7 trillion (US$73 billion)).

In Europe, the main stock markets dropped at least 3% on August 24. The FTSE lost -4.4% (£78bn) but upon opening on August 25, shot up 116 points (1.97%).

The DJIA opened 1,000 points lower on August 24, but gained nearly half of it back in the first 30 minutes. The New York Times used the term "upheaval" to describe the market situation. It remained down 588 points at the close of trading. Hedge funds, which, for the most part, had long positions on the eve of the downturn, suffered substantial losses as stocks such as Apple, Citigroup, Facebook and Amazon lost value. The BSE SENSEX fell 1,600 points on August 24 as the rupee fell to 66.69 per dollar.

Tuesday, August 25, was another day of sharp losses on the SSE Composite Index, which dropped 7.6%, making a 40% downturn in the market since June. The two day loss for the SSE Composite Index was over 15%.

Meanwhile, Asian and European markets finished higher, and the day began with a major 440 point upsurge for the DJIA; however, the gains turned to losses, with the DJIA plunging in the final hour to lose over 200 points for the day (1.3%).

On Wednesday, August 26, 2015, the SSE Composite Index swung widely and ended down another 1.3%. This was in spite of a cut in the borrowing rate in China. Late the previous day, it was announced that the Chinese legal authorities were investigating Citic Securities, the largest brokerage in the country, for possible illegal securities trading. In addition to eight executives at the firm under scrutiny, a news reporter and members of the China Securities Regulatory Commission were reportedly taken into custody.

On August 26, the U.S. markets rallied, with the three major indexes, the DJIA, NASDAQ Composite, and the S&P 500 Index all registering gains of about 4%. It was the 3rd largest point gain on the list of largest daily changes in the Dow Jones Industrial Average. The DJIA rose another 319 points the next day, causing the aforementioned record to be set.

=== Subsequent volatility in 2015 ===
On the following Tuesday, September 1, the SSE Composite Index declined 1.23%, Britain's FTSE dropped 3%, and the German DAX index declined 2.4%. In the U.S., the DJIA dropped to 16,058.35 points (2.8%) and the Nasdaq Composite fell 140.40 (2.9%). Most markets recovered the day after.

On September 18, 2015, the Federal Reserve did not raise interest rates at its meeting. On that day, after a multi-week recovery in which the DJIA had recovered to 16,700, the DJIA plunged 290 points. The Nasdaq Composite fell 70 points, the FTSE 100 fell 65 points and the Nikkei 225 fell 362 points. World stock markets continued to fall in late September, with the DJIA down to 16,004 by September 29, 2015. This, coupled with other stocks (FTSE100, Hang Seng Index, Nikkei) falling the same or more, set the stage for billions to be lost.

=== Stock market performance on January 20, 2016 widely attributed to low oil value ===
On January 20, 2016, due to crude oil falling below $27 a barrel, the DJIA closed down 249 points after falling 565 points intraday. The FTSE 100 fell 3.62% in a single day and entered bear market territory.

=== Stock market performance in February 2016 as a result of Brexit vote announcement ===
In February 2016, British Prime Minister David Cameron announced that the Government was to recommend that the UK should remain in the EU and that the referendum would be held on 23 June, marking the official launch of the campaign. He also announced that Parliament would enact secondary legislation relating to the European Union Referendum Act 2015 on 22 February. With the official launch, ministers of the UK Government were then free to campaign on either side of the argument in a rare exception to Cabinet collective responsibility. This announcement led British pound fell to $1.393, the lowest since 2009 and lead the uncertainty in stock markets around the world.

=== Stock market performance in June 2016 as a result of Brexit vote ===
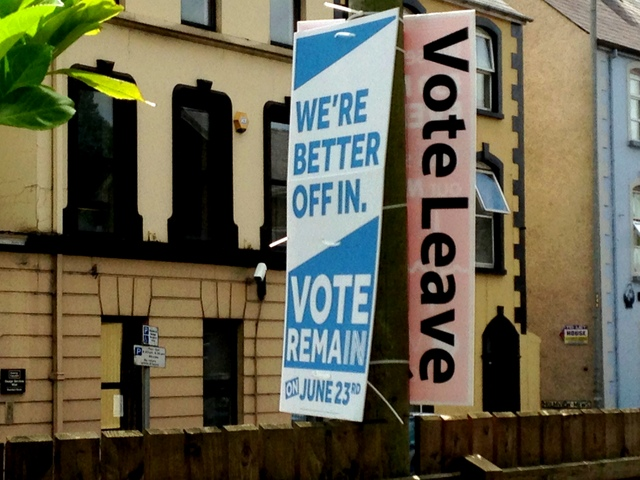
Remain and Leave Brexit posters

On June 14, 2016, polls showed that a vote in favor of Brexit was more likely. The FTSE 100 fell 2% and markets sold off globally. On June 20, 2016, after further polls suggested a move back towards Remain, the pound and the FTSE recovered. Global markets also recovered.

On June 22, 2016, the day of the referendum, Sterling hit a 2016 high and the FTSE 100 climbed to a 2016 high of $1.5018 and 6338.10 respectively as a new poll suggested a win for the Remain campaign. Initial results from Newcastle suggested a vote for 'remain' and the value of the pound held its value. However, when the next result for Sunderland was announced, it indicated an unexpected swing to 'leave'. Subsequent results appeared to confirm this swing and sterling fell in value to $1.3777, its lowest level since 1985. However, the following Monday when the markets opened, Sterling fell to a new low of $1.32.

When the London Stock Exchange opened on the morning of 24 June, the FTSE 100 fell from 6338.10 to 5806.13 in the first ten minutes of trading. It recovered to 6091.27 after a further 90 minutes before further recovering to 6162.97 by the end of the day's trading. When the markets reopened the Following Monday, the FTSE 100 showed a steady decline losing over 2% by mid-afternoon. Upon opening later on the Friday after the referendum, the DJIA dropped nearly 450 points or about 2½% in less than half an hour. The Associated Press called the sudden worldwide stock market decline a stock market crash. George Soros called the referendum a Black Friday for Britain.

The vote led to stock market crashes around the world. Investors in worldwide stock markets lost more than the equivalent of 2 trillion United States dollars on 24 June 2016, making it the worst single day loss in history. The market losses amounted to a total of 3 trillion US dollars by June 27, 2016. By June 29, 2016, the markets had largely recovered. Britain's sovereign debt credit rating was lowered by Standard & Poor's, as was the European Union's.

The euro fell by almost 4% against the United States dollar, while traditional "safe haven assets" such as gold and the Japanese Yen surged. Crude oil prices fell below $48 per barrel. The French CAC 40 and German DAX initially fell by over 10% upon opening, while bank shares from the two countries fell by more. Likewise, the Spanish IBEX 35, Greek ATHEX, Dutch AEX index, Czech PX Index and Polish WIG30 all fell by eight to 15 percent. The Swiss franc, a traditional save haven asset, rose sharply, thus prompting the Swiss National Bank to intervene in the foreign exchange market to cap the rise. It issued a statement that read: "Following the United Kingdom's vote to leave the European Union, the Swiss franc came under upward pressure. The Swiss National Bank has intervened in the foreign exchange market to stabilise the situation and will remain active in that market." Yields on European sovereign bonds spiked, with 10-year bonds in Spain and Italy rose as much as 0.40% in early trades. Sweden's Riksbank issued a statement that read it was "following the financial market developments closely and has a continuing dialogue with other authorities. We have contacts with the Swedish banks and other central banks. We are ready to take the necessary actions to handle financial market distortions."

By mid afternoon on June 27, 2016, the sterling was at a 31-year low, having fallen 11% in two trading days and the FTSE 100 had surrendered £85 billion. By 29 June it had recovered all its losses since the markets closed on polling day.

In the Asian-Pacific region, markets also fell, with Nikkei 225 lead the Asian selloff, fell 7.92% to 14,952.02, the biggest selloff since March 2011 and the lowest level since October 2014. Meanwhile, an unnamed official at the Bank of Korea in South Korea declined to comment on rumours it intervened in the foreign exchange market, but Vice Finance Minister Choi Sang-Mok said the government would take all efforts to minimise the impact of the result. An unnamed policymaker with knowledge of the Reserve Bank of India's (RBI) plans for related market management said that it was "prepared to deal with any volatility". Unnamed officials at SEBI said that they were in touch with the RBI on the market developments amid surveillance being beefed up to curb excess volatility and possible manipulations in various trading segments, including currency derivatives. The Australian dollar, which has traditionally been sold off in times of financial market uncertainty, fell strongly against the dollar and the yen. Other traditional markers of uncertainty, such as interbank dollar funding rates in Singapore and Hong Kong, were more steady. Hong Kong Financial Secretary John Tsang said: "Because of this matter, we have made preparation in many aspects. We have reserved sufficient liquidity and we are able to handle in different situations." The Hong Kong Monetary Authority asked banks within its jurisdiction to maintain ample cash conditions and that no unscheduled monetary liquidity injection operations had been taken. The Singapore Exchange sought to reduce volatility by raising margins on Nikkei futures traded on its exchange. The Chinese yuan fell to its weakest level against the US dollar since January 2011 while its offshore counterpart slipped to its weakest level in more than four months, despite a possibly unrelated People's Bank of China injection of 170 billion yuan into the system. The Philippines Central Bank issued a statement that read it was closely monitoring the foreign exchange market and would be prepared to act to ensure orderly transactions and smooth volatility.

In the US, government bonds effectively priced in a small Federal Open Market Committee interest rate cut from a rate increase in July. When American markets opened there was a dramatic fall from Canada to Brazil.

The referendum result also had an immediate negative economic impact on a number of other countries. The South African rand experienced its largest single-day decline since the Great Recession in 2008, dropping in value by over 8% against the United States dollar. Other countries negatively affected include Canada, whose stock exchange fell 1.70%, Nigeria, and Kenya. This was partly due to a general global financial shift out of currencies seen as risky and into the US dollar, and partly due to concerns over how the UK's withdrawal from the EU would impact on the economies and trade relations with close economic links to the United Kingdom.

However, by September 2016 British media had reported that ignoring so-called 'Project Fear' scaremongering had rewarded those shareholders with the insight to ignore the pessimism after the FTSE250 broke all records in the months following the referendum to leave the EU.

During a press conference on 27 June 2016, Chancellor of the Exchequer George Osborne attempted to reassure financial markets that the UK economy was not in serious trouble. This came after media reports that a survey by the Institute of Directors suggested that two-thirds of businesses believed that the outcome of the referendum would produce negative results as well as the dropping value of the sterling and the FTSE 100 which began on Friday, 24 June 2016. British businesses had also predicted that investment cuts, hiring freezes and redundancies would be necessary to cope with the results of the referendum. Osborne indicated that Britain was facing the future "from a position of strength" and there was no current need for an emergency Budget. "No-one should doubt our resolve to maintain the fiscal stability we have delivered for this country .... And to companies, large and small, I would say this: the British economy is fundamentally strong, highly competitive and we are open for business." Later that afternoon, the sterling was at a 31-year low, having fallen 11% in two trading days and the FTSE 100 index had surrendered £85 billion. Trading in Barclays Bank and Royal Bank of Scotland was briefly suspended after their prices fell sharply. At the close of trading, the domestically-focused FTSE 250 index was down approximately 14% as compared to the day before the referendum results were published (23 June 2016).

By 1 July, the FTSE 100 had risen above pre-referendum levels, indeed, risen further to a ten-month high. Taking the previous fall into account, this represented the index's largest single-week rise since 2011. On 11 July, it officially entered bull market territory, having risen by more than 20% from its February low. However, the weak pound meant that when measured in US dollars, the FTSE 100 index remained 6% below pre-Brexit levels. The FTSE 250 Index, which contains more British companies and fewer multinationals, moved above its pre-referendum level on 27 July. In the US, the S&P 500, a broader market than the Dow Jones, reached an all-time high on 11 July. The DJIA and Nasdaq Composite, both reached an all-time high on 12 July and 8 August respectively.

It was expected that the weaker pound would benefit aerospace and defence firms, pharmaceutical companies, and professional services companies; the share prices of these companies were boosted after the EU referendum.

The pound remained low, and became the worst performing currency of the year to date against 31 other major currencies.

== Reactions ==
Several politicians have indicated strong personal opinions about the stock market selloff. Speaking on August 24, German chancellor Angela Merkel and France's President François Hollande described the world economy as "solid" and expressed confidence that the China market crash and subsequent market swings would ease up. Merkel stated "China will do everything in its power to stabilize the economic situation."

On the other hand, U.S. businessman and candidate for the Republican presidential nomination Donald Trump stated on August 24 that he felt that the stock selloff could get "messy". Trump was critical of policies that bound the Chinese and U.S. economies together. Also on the 24th, a fellow candidate for the Republican nomination, Chris Christie, blamed President Obama for borrowing too much money from China, saying that the U.S. and Chinese economy had become "interdependent". Christie commented figuratively that "If the Chinese get a cough, we get the flu."

On the day after the referendum, Bank of England Governor Mark Carney told a press conference:

The capital requirements of our largest banks are now 10 times higher than before the financial crisis. The Bank of England has stress-tested those banks against scenarios far more severe than our country currently faces. As a result of these actions UK banks have raised over a £130bn of new capital and now have more than £600bn of high quality liquid assets. That substantial capital and huge liquidity gives banks the flexibility they need to continue to lend to UK businesses and households even during challenging times.
Moreover, as a backstop to support the functioning of the markets the Bank of England stands ready to provide more than £250bn of additional funds through its normal market operations. The Bank of England is also able to provide substantial liquidity in foreign currency if required. We expect institutions to draw on this funding if and when appropriate.
It will take some time for the UK to establish a new relationship with Europe and the rest of the world. So some market and economic volatility can be expected as this process unfolds, but we are well prepared for this. Her Majesty's Treasury and the Bank of England have engaged in extensive contingency planning and the chancellor and I have remained in close contact including through the night and this morning. The Bank of England will not hesitate to take additional measure as required, as markets adjust.

Nonetheless, share prices of the five largest British banks fell an average of 21% the morning after the referendum. By the end of Friday's trading, both HSBC and Standard Chartered had fully recovered, while Lloyds, RBS Group and Barclays remained more than 10% down.

All of the Big Three credit rating agencies reacted negatively to the vote: Standard & Poor's cut the UK credit rating from AAA to AA, Fitch Group cut from AA+ to AA, and Moody's cut the UK's outlook to "negative".

To try to arrest the downturn and increase financial stability, on July 5, 2016, the Bank of England released £150 billion in lending by reducing the countercyclical capital buffers that banks are required to hold.

Fears of a crash in property values led investors to begin redeeming investments in property funds, prompting Standard Life to freeze trading on July 4, and Aviva followed suit the next day. Other investment companies including Henderson Group and M&G Investments cut the amount that investors cashing in their funds would receive.

On July 12, the global investment management company BlackRock predicted the UK would experience a recession in late 2016 or early 2017 as a result of the vote to leave the EU, and that economic growth would slow down for at least five years because of a reduction in UK investment. On July 18, the UK-based economic forecasting group EY ITEM club suggested the country would experience a "short shallow recession" as the economy suffered "severe confidence effects on spending and business"; it also cut its economic growth forecasts for the UK from 2.6% to 0.4% in 2017, and 2.4% to 1.4% for 2018. The group's chief economic adviser, Peter Soencer, also argued there would be more long-term implications, and that the UK "may have to adjust to a permanent reduction in the size of the economy, compared to the trend that seemed possible prior to the vote". Senior City investor Richard Buxton also argued there would be a "mild recession". On July 19, the International Monetary Fund (IMF) reduced its 2017 economic growth forecast for the UK from 2.2% to 1.3%, but still expected Britain to be the second fastest growing economy in the G7 during 2016; the IMF also reduced its forecasts for world economic growth by 0.1% to 3.1% in 2016 and 3.4% in 2017, as a result of the referendum, which it said had "thrown a spanner in the works" of global recovery.

On July 20, a report released by the Bank of England said that although uncertainty had risen "markedly" since the referendum, it was yet to see evidence of a sharp economic decline as a consequence. However, around a third of contacts surveyed for the report expected there to be "some negative impact" over the following year.

== See also ==
- 2015–2016 Chinese stock market turbulence
- 2016 United Kingdom European Union membership referendum
- Greek government-debt crisis
- List of stock market crashes and bear markets
- Stock market crashes in India
