= 2022 stock market decline =

Worldwide economic event

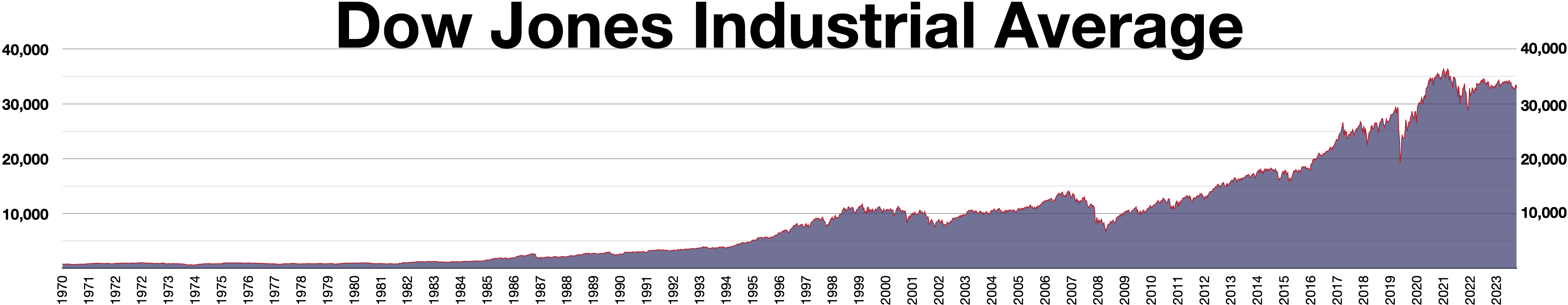
Dow Jones Industrial Average (1970–2023)

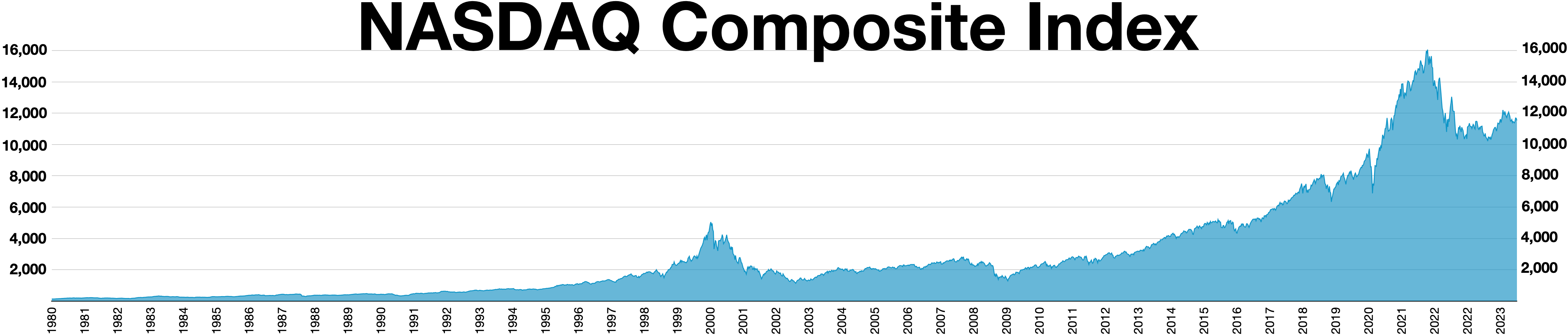
Nasdaq Composite Index (1980–2023)

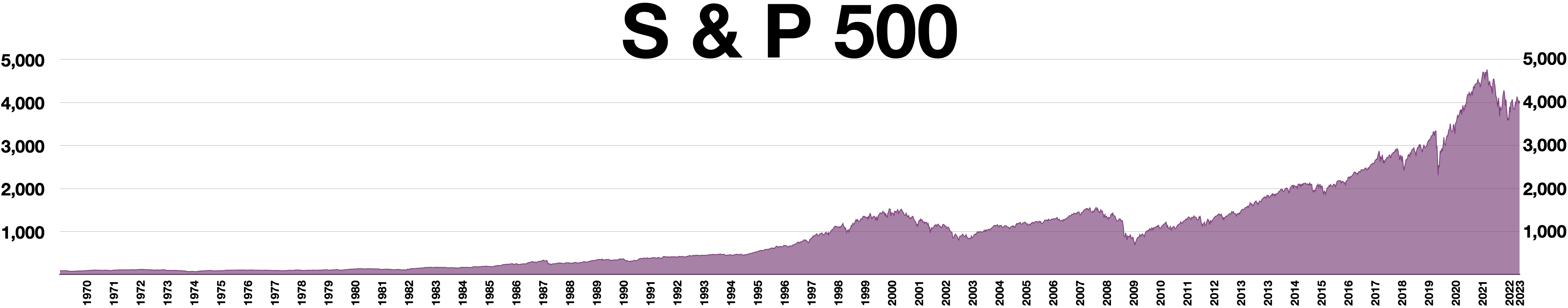
S&P 500 (1970–2023)

The 2022 stock market decline was a bear market that included the decline of several stock market indices worldwide between January and October 2022. The decline was due to the highest inflation readings as part of the 2021–2023 inflation surge and the resulting increases in interest rates, combined with the worst year for the bond market since 1994 with fears of a global recession due to a decline in economic indicators and an inverted yield curve, exacerbated by supply chain disruptions due to the Russian invasion of Ukraine and uncertainty over the long-term effects of the COVID-19 pandemic on the economy.

In 2021, many central banks undertook a zero interest rate policy, assuming the rise in inflation to be "temporary" or "transitory". In 2022, when inflation readings were much higher and stickier than originally expected, central banks rapidly tightened policy and reduced market liquidity. The Federal Reserve raised interest rates 11 times starting in March 2022, resulting in the highest nominal interest rates since the 2000s. It also reintroduced a policy of quantitative tightening in June 2022. The European Central Bank raised rates 10 consecutive times during the same period.

In the first quarter of 2022, U.S. gross domestic product (GDP) posted its first decline since the COVID-19 recession; decreasing at an annual rate of 1.0% in the first quarter of 2022. GDP growth rates in the European Union also slowed significantly in the first half of 2022.

But the rate of inflation peaked in late 2022 and declined thereafter, while economic growth accelerated in the second half of 2022, ending fears of a recession and leading to a rebound in stock prices starting in late 2022. The end of the stock market decline was also a result of the start of the AI boom, predictions of lower or stable interest rates, and predictions of a soft landing. By 2023 and 2024, many stock market indices reached all-time highs.

== Stock market performance ==
In 2022 the MSCI World Index, which tracks developed markets, was down 17.7%. The emerging markets index declined 19.7%. Asia overall was down 20.8% due to a 21.8% decline in Chinese stocks, a 29.1% decline in Taiwan, and a 28.9% decline in Korea.

=== United States ===
The S&P 500 peaked for the year at 4,796 on its January 3, 2022, close, before declining 25% to its low for the year in October 2022.

In the first 6 months of 2022, the S&P 500 fell 21%, the worst 6-month start to a year since 1970.

On September 13, 2022, the S&P 500 declined by 4.32% in its largest single-day drop since June 2020.

The S&P 500 had the worst results since 2008, with a decline of 19% for the year. The Nasdaq Composite fell 33%.

=== Europe ===
Stocks in Europe outperformed on the year due to lower valuations. The STOXX Europe 600 lost 12% on the year, the DAX lost 12.5%, and the CAC 40 lost 9.5%.

=== Japan ===
The Nikkei 225 started the year at around 29,000 but fell to 25,000 by March. It ended the year down 9%. However, by 2024, it hit all time highs.

=== China ===
By November 2022 the Hang Seng Index was down 36% year-to-date, one of the worst performances among major stock market indices. The decline was exacerbated when Xi Jinping won a third tenure of the general secretaryship, and investors feared that he would prioritize state-owned firms over private companies. The decline was also due to concerns over the economic effects of Xi Jinping's Zero-COVID strategy and its regulatory crackdown and fines on companies such as Ant Group.

== Cryptocurrency performance ==
As part of the global decline in most risky assets, the price of Bitcoin fell 59% in 2022, and it declined 72% from its then all-time high reached on November 8, 2021. The decline was at its worst in June 2022; an article in The Wall Street Journal published that month was titled "The Crypto Party Is Over". However, by 2024, many cryptocurrencies reached all-time highs.
