= Friday the 13th mini-crash =

1989 stock market crash

The Friday the 13th mini-crash, or Black Friday, was a stock market crash that occurred on Friday, October 13, 1989. The crash was apparently caused by a reaction to a news story of the breakdown of a $6.75 billion leveraged buyout deal for UAL Corporation, the parent company of United Airlines. When the UAL deal fell through, it helped trigger the collapse of the junk bond market. The deal unraveled because the Association of Flight Attendants pulled out of the deal when management, in negotiations over an employee stock ownership plan (ESOP) designed to fund the leveraged buyout, refused to agree to terms.

== The close ==
Moments after the UAL Corporation deal fell through, the indices began their plunge. When the closing bell rang, the Dow Jones Industrial Average had dropped 190.58 points, or 6.91%., to 2,569.26, and the NASDAQ Composite had shed 14.90 points, or 3.09%., to 467.30; and the S&P 500 Index had fallen 21.74 points, or 6.12 percent, to 333.65. The Dow Jones Transportation Average fell 78.05 (5.26%) on the 13th, and fell another 102.04 (7.26%) on the 16th for a total decline of 12.13%. The major indices had closed at all-time highs as recently as Monday, October 9.

== Survey ==
Many investors were left stunned. Since most market participants blame the UAL deal as the culprit, survey researcher William Feltus and Robert Shiller, the author of Irrational Exuberance, conducted a telephone survey of 101 market professionals in the business days following the crash and asked if they had heard about the UAL news before or after the crash: 36% of those surveyed said that they had heard about it before the losses set in, and 53% said that it was afterwards.

The market professionals also believed that the UAL story was just an attention-grabber, with traders trying to find a reason to sell: 50% believed that was the reason, and 30% believed the news would reduce future takeovers.

== Aftermath ==
The crash is often pinpointed as the start of the early 1990s recession, but the surprisingly-low growth rates (almost 0%) during the summer months and the savings and loan crisis earlier that year had triggered the crisis almost concurrently with the mini-crash, which, in turn, got blamed by the public (the memory of the 1987 crash still being fresh) as the true culprit of the recession.

== See also ==
- Black Monday, the global stock market crash on October 19, 1987
- Friday the 13th, considered an unlucky day in Western superstition
