= 1994 bond market crisis =

Global financial crisis

The 1994 bond market crisis, or Great Bond Massacre, was a sudden drop in bond market prices across the developed world. It began in Japan and the United States (US), and spread through the rest of the world. After the recession of the early 1990s, historically low interest rates in many industrialized nations preceded an unexpectedly volatile year for bond investors, including those that held on to mortgage debts. Over 1994, a rise in rates, along with the relatively quick spread of bond market volatility across international borders, resulted in a mass sell-off of bonds and debt funds as yields rose beyond expectations. This was especially the case for instruments with comparatively longer maturities attached. Some financial observers argued that the plummet in bond prices was triggered by the Federal Reserve's decision to raise rates by 25 basis points in February, in a move to counter inflation. At about $1.5 trillion in lost market value across the globe, the crash has been described as the worst financial event for bond investors since 1927.

== Background ==
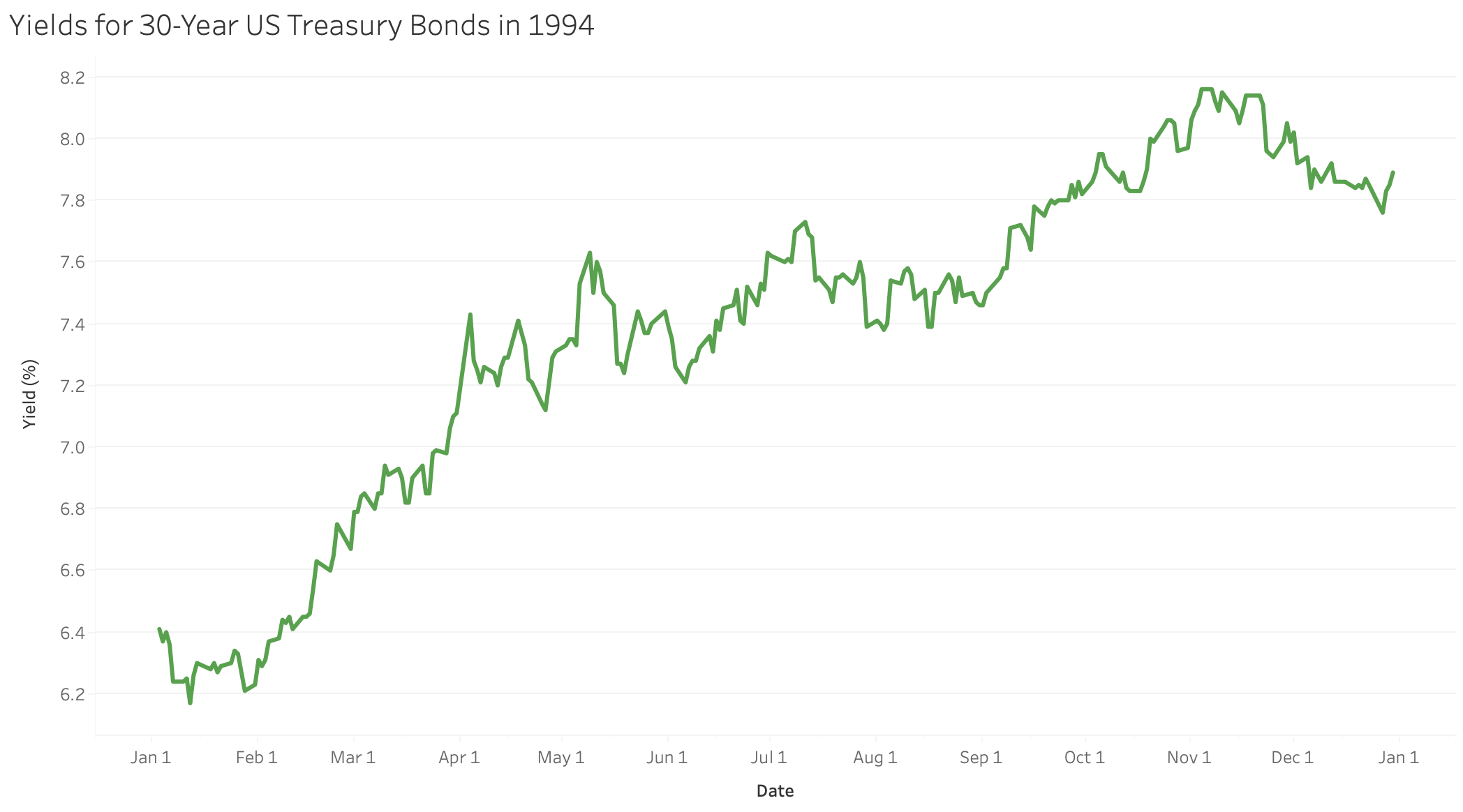
Line graph illustrating the yields of 30-year US Treasury bonds over 1994. Yields for these bonds rose from 6.17% on January 12 to 8.16% on November 4.

In 1993, the bond market was enjoying a relatively bullish run following a recession that plagued many industrialized nations several years earlier. Throughout much of Europe, long-term interest rates were nearing 30-year lows, with France and Germany's rates being even lower than the US's at that time. European investors predicted that short-term rates would continue to decline into 1994 and bring with them shrinking long-term rates, which would enhance their leverage on current bond holdings.

Prior to the crash however, some financial analysts in the US had forecast a hike in the yields of 30-year Treasury bonds, which would be prompted by the Fed raising interest rates to combat inflation. As late as January 1994, President of the Standard & Poor's Index Leo O'Neill noted how, despite the fact that the majority of junk bonds issued by the corporate sector had earned upgrades for the first time since 1980, the dollar value of those that had been downgraded actually exceeded these by more than $110 billion. He warned that overconfidence in the economy would permeate the markets much as it did prior to Black Monday in 1987, and worried that any contractionary moves by the Fed would significantly depress the returns on bond funds.

In the US, compared to the rest of the recovery after the recession, the fourth quarter of 1993 witnessed a notably higher rate of expansion at 5.9%. Yet apprehension was raised amongst some over the prospect of an overheated economy, and triggered fears that inflation would overwhelm the growth and depress real wage gains. Former Salomon Brothers chief economist Henry Kaufman described how interest in junk bonds and derivatives had risen during the recession, but noted the economy's hastening pace as a warning for bond investors into the new year.

Other analysts offered a more optimistic outlook, arguing that inflationary pressures were relatively absent and failed to manifest despite the economy's recent recovery. Ian Amstad of Chase Manhattan predicted that the yield curve would continue to flatten as long-term bond rates declined. He suggested that President Bill Clinton's signing of the Omnibus Budget Reconciliation Act of 1993 would be a "favorable backdrop" for investors by providing additional downward pressure on future interest rates, thereby raising bond prices over time.

== The crash ==
The immediate trigger of the crash in the US occurred at the Federal Open Market Committee (FOMC) on February 3 and 4, 1994, although bond prices in Japan had started plummeting just a month earlier. Led by Chairman Alan Greenspan, the Committee reached a consensus to slightly raise its federal funds rate target from 3% to 3.25%. It was the Fed's first move to shrink the money supply since 1989. Over the rest of 1994, the Fed agreed to several other contractionary moves. It increased its target by 25 basis points in March and April, 50 points in May and August, and 75 points in November. By its last meeting of the year, the rate resided at 5.5%.

The Fed's first announcement of the year, combined with an array of other factors within and outside the US, prompted a mass sell-off of bonds and debt funds worldwide. Starting in March, as the bond market's newfound turbulence became more settled in investors' minds worldwide, homeowners were discouraged from refinancing their properties further due to the rise in long-term rates. As a result of the crash, bonds lost about $1.5 trillion in market value globally. Among these losses, about $1 trillion applied to US debts.

Many debates on the crash centered at the Fed's February decision. In the Journal of Macroeconomics, Associate Professor Willem Thorbecke of George Mason University hypothesized that inflation worries, in conjunction with confusions over the Fed's next monetary move, contributed to the drop in bond prices within the US. These sentiments coincided with apprehensions about an overheated economy. From his empirical model, while both factors were instrumental toward shrinking bond prices, Thorbecke deduced that concerns over inflation were more than twice as critical as monetary policy uncertainty in determining how far long-term Treasury bond prices declined.

On the other hand, some financial observers argued that market dynamics played a greater role than economic fundamentals in causing the crash and intensifying bond volatility over 1994. According to a report published by the Bank for International Settlements (BIS) a year after the crash, a rise in realized money market instability corresponded with a similar increase in implied volatility for bond yields.

Others, such as Chairman of the House Banking Committee Henry B. González, blamed hedge funds for the crash. Along with Securities and Exchange Commission (SEC) Chairman Arthur Levitt Jr., they accused hedge funds of irresponsibly speculating on long lines of credit, despite being at odds over whether they needed additional regulations.

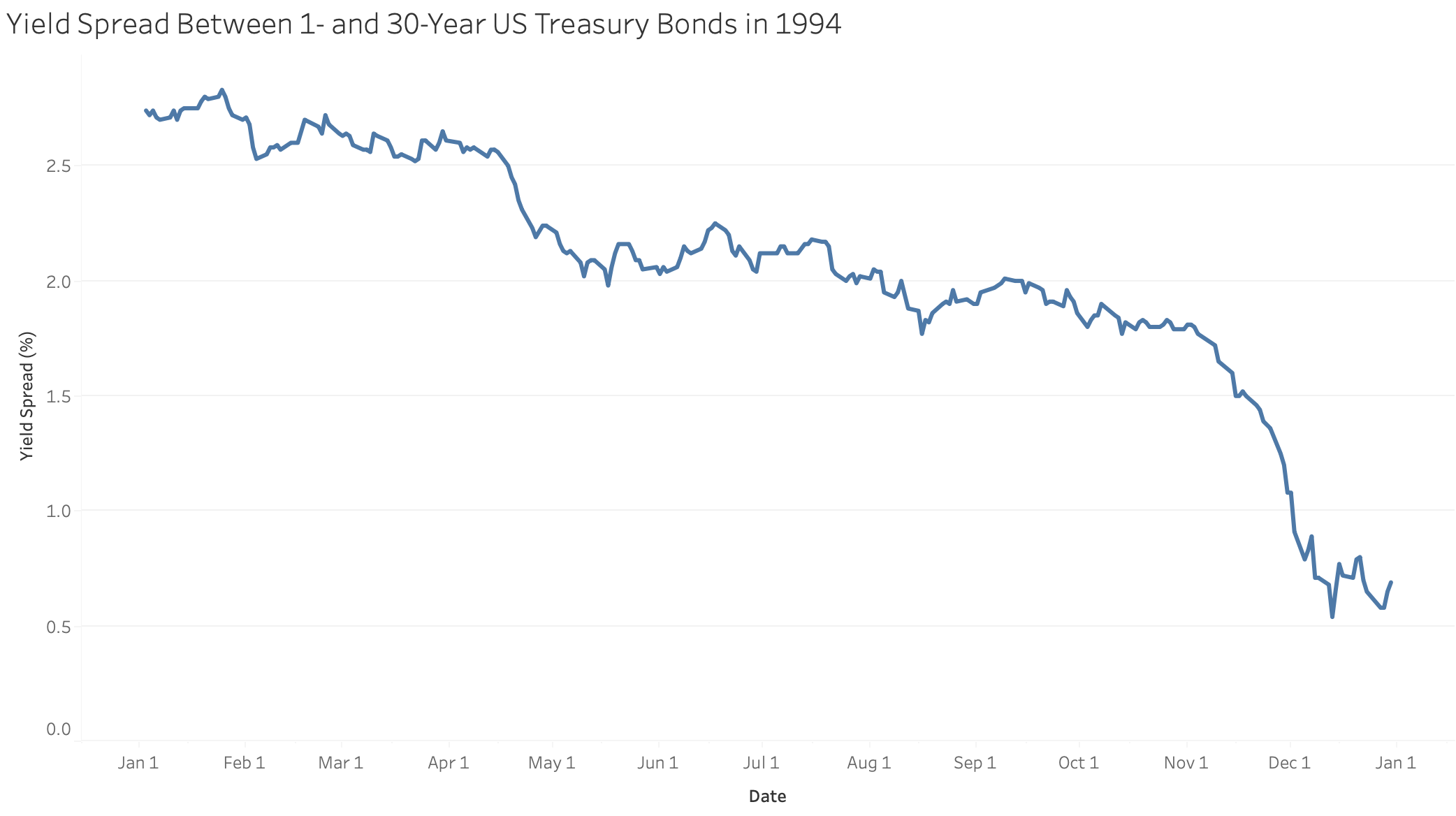
Line graph of the yield spread between 1- and 30-year US Treasury bonds over 1994. Originally at 2.83% on January 25, the spread between these bonds dropped to 0.54% by December 13.

=== United States ===
Considering how many investors had earlier evaluated the bond market as relatively stable, citing declining interest rates shortly after the recession, the crash's effects were quickly realized in the US. Prior to the Fed's meeting in February, many investors weren't expecting a contraction. In fact, five years earlier, the Fed's decision to keep short-term interest rates down preceded a pattern of relatively low to stable interest rates that continued up to the pivotal meeting. Between September 1989 and February 1994, the Fed had dropped short-term rates several times through 1992, and held them constant over 1993.

This period created a bubble that buoyed investors' expectations of enhanced liquidity in the market, as well as extended stability for higher-yield debts into 1994. Many investors were encouraged to simultaneously borrow short-term funds and buy bonds with longer maturities attached. Near the end of 1992, they cited the relatively wide spread between short- and long-term rates as their leverage and rationale to allocate a larger portion of their portfolios toward higher-yield debts. At that time, the federal funds rate stood at 3%, while long-term bonds offered yields of more than 7.5%.

The Fed's decision to raise short-term interest rates in February caught investors off-guard, and prompted a sell-off as stock prices began plummeting. Yields for 30-year Treasury bonds immediately spiked upward, and would continue to rise by more than 150 basis points over the first nine months of the year.

A couple of days after the announcement, some investors criticized the Fed for essentially confirming any lingering fears of inflation within the market since the last quarter of 1993. The overriding sentiment among investors turned into one that would remain wary of future rate hikes for the rest of the year, and demand for bonds consequently shifted leftward. Profits within the securities industry also took a hit, and projected to be 80% lower overall than in 1993.

=== Europe ===
The US's monetary contraction in February precipitated a volatility spillover effect that leaked into Europe within several months. The inordinate decline in bond returns prompted some financial observers to compare the crash to Black Monday several years earlier for witnessing almost the same spillover effect internationally. Taking into account stocks' normally higher volatility compared to bonds, the Bank's report described how spillovers were less of a feature of interrelated bond markets across the globe compared to stock markets. While the Bank hypothesized that the spillover itself couldn't explain why the bond market's volatility augmented to the level it did in 1994, it described how implied bond yield volatility co-varied significantly across Europe. This was especially the case when comparing France, the Netherlands, and the UK's yields with Germany's. Along with the US, major European bond markets saw their volatilities rise between 10 and 20% throughout 1994. In Germany's case, the degree to which the Fed's decision caused its bond rates to rise 200 basis points early on was the subject of a heated debate among observers.

Across continental Europe, a decline in international capital flows further aggravated the markets' turbulence and prompted foreign investors, including financial firms located in the UK, to sell off their bonds. As with the spillover effect, liquidation of government bond holdings by these investors corresponded with a rise in implied bond yield volatility, especially in France (14%), Germany (9%), and Italy (6%). The simultaneous decline in bond prices reflected their overriding tendency to leverage their holdings amid the higher volatility. Compared to Black Monday, foreign disinvestment and leverage played a significantly greater role in exacerbating the European bond markets' volatilities over 1994.

=== Japan ===
The joint rises in realized money market instability and implied bond yield volatility quickly became apparent in Japan, which was the first of the G7 nations to see bond prices drop in 1994. In fact, Japan had already started seeing domestic yields fluctuate more rapidly just a month prior to the Fed's decision. The joint destabilization of its money and bond markets was further exacerbated by the yen's appreciation, which shifted expectations on consumer prices and short-term rates, and brought with it nationwide deflation. In contrast to Europe, Japan did not exhibit any significant co-variability with the US in terms of bond yield volatility.

=== Mexico ===
The period of time leading up to and following the crash was a precursor to the Mexican peso crisis that ensued at the end of 1994. Starting in the late 1980s, enthusiasm among Mexican investors soared amid the rapid pace of financial liberalization following Mexico's decision to abandon import substitution industrialization (ISI) and peg the peso to the US dollar. The latter reform was enacted under the goal of maintaining a stable exchange rate between the two currencies. As interest in Mexican assets rose following these policy changes, investor confidence was further boosted by the Fed maintaining relatively low interest rates in response to the recession of the early 1990s.

Much as what occurred in the US however, this enthusiasm produced a bubble that preceded a tumultuous year for Mexico in the financial sphere. In 1994, the Fed's February announcement diminished investors' confidence in Mexican assets. Combined with excessive borrowing to maintain a strong peso under the peg policy and the assassination of Institutional Revolutionary Party (PRI) presidential candidate Luis Donaldo Colosio Murrieta, these factors destabilized Mexico's financial markets. Capital flight likewise exhausted Mexico's foreign exchange reserves, and eventually culminated in a severe recession the following year.

== Aftermath ==
In the US, a team of analysts at the Securities Industry Association (SIA) co-wrote a financial report evaluating the losses for bond investors there. They calculated the total market value lost by domestic bonds to be 10% between January 1 and November 15, 1994. Of the approximately $1 trillion in losses within the US, Treasury bonds accounted for about $500 billion, corporate bonds $300 billion, and municipal bonds $200 billion. Noting the higher risk associated with longer maturities, the analysts outlined a positive relationship between a bond's term and the amount by which its price declined over 1994. For example, while Treasury bonds with maturities from 1 to 3 years saw their prices decline by less 5%, those with 20-year terms dropped by 20.5%.

In 2013, a selloff of about $2.5 billion in perpetual bonds across Asia prompted some observers to compare it to the crash of 1994. These bonds were similar to high-yield debts offered in other areas around the world. However, others argued that fears over the selloff were overblown, citing the US dollar's recent appreciation. They predicted this would make export-oriented economies throughout Asia more competitive globally since their currencies were no longer pegged to the dollar as in 1994.

Upon witnessing their 1994 losses, some observers argued that investors' reactions shortly after the US's first monetary contraction of that year discouraged the Fed from acting too aggressively in raising interest rates later on. They cited the Fed's decision to implement several rounds of quantitative easing (QE) in response to the 2008 financial crisis, and to maintain near-zero rates through 2016. In light of this monetary transition however, RBS Securities head of North America sales Richard Tang predicted that any cessation in QE would make investors anxious over the chances for future rate hikes. He criticized the Fed and other central banks for "artificially manipulating" rates to create long lines of credit that would encourage investors to switch toward other assets.

Other observers suggested that rate hike concerns would prompt investors to change their perceptions on the bond market to avoid getting caught off-guard as in 1994. Amid the prolonged periods of near-zero rates, PIMCO managing director Scott Mather argued that investors would continue buying bonds with low yields along with riskier assets to diversify their portfolios, but warned about the potential "unwinding" that would ensue once the QE rounds expired. Similarly in 2013, Yamaichi International trader Rick Klingman and Merrill Lynch credit market strategist Hans Mikkelsen predicted that investors who were unaccustomed to "aggressive rate tightening cycle[s]" would rashly enter the bond market, citing "easy monetary policy, subpar economic growth, and low inflation" as factors.

== See also ==
- Black Monday (1987)
- Early 1990s recession
- High-yield debt
- Mexican peso crisis
- Yield curve
