= Financial market impact of the COVID-19 pandemic =

Economic turmoil associated with the pandemic

Economic turmoil associated with the COVID-19 pandemic has had wide-ranging and severe impacts upon financial markets, including stock, bond, and commodity (including crude oil and gold) markets. Major events included a described Russia–Saudi Arabia oil price war, which after failing to reach an OPEC+ agreement resulted in a collapse of crude oil prices and a stock market crash in March 2020. The effects upon markets are part of the COVID-19 recession and are among the many economic impacts of the pandemic.

== Financial risk and country risk ==
As the COVID-19 pandemic put Europe and the United States in virtual lock down, financial economists, credit rating and country risk experts have scrambled to rearrange their assessments in light of the unprecedented geo-economic challenges posed by the crisis. M. Nicolas Firzli, a director of the World Pensions Council (WPC) and advisory board member at the World Bank Global Infrastructure Facility, refers to it as "the greater financial crisis", and says it is bringing to the surface many pent-up financial and geopolitical dysfunctions:

So far, the only European countries forced to put in place short-selling bans are Italy, Spain and France: three of the four largest economies in the enfeebled European Union." He believes the financial vulnerability of Madrid, Milan and Paris is due to an often-overlooked geo-economic reality, which could come to the fore in the coming days. "By OECD standards, Spain, Italy and France have very weak pension assets bases. Their combined pension wealth is more than 15 times smaller than that of jurisdictions such as the UK or Australia. In times of acute crisis, like today, they lack cash-rich domestic buyers of last resort for the bonds and equities traded on their financial markets. Their national economies will suffer as a result, and their political sovereignty itself may be severely eroded."

The OECD points out that businesses in many countries have become highly indebted, while the very low cost of borrowing and accommodative monetary policy has contributed to unprecedented corporate debt issuance.

Businesses in European cohesion regions are more concerned about the pandemic's consequences. Companies in affected areas anticipate long-term effects on their supply chain from the outbreak. A bigger proportion of businesses anticipate permanent employment losses as a result of the digitalization transformation brought on by COVID-19.

Consequently, the corporate debt stands at very high levels in many G20 countries. Also, lower-rated credit issued in the form of BBB bonds, non-investment grade bonds, and leveraged loans has risen to elevated levels, the OECD warns, meaning businesses will have little choice but to reduce costs and employment to withstand insolvency pressures.

Economic activity decreased by almost 4% in the majority of sub-regions of Europe and Central Asia in 2020, which was similar to the global average of 3.2%. However, the high infection and mortality rates of the pandemic in countries in the Western Balkans, the Eastern Neighborhood, and Central and Eastern Europe meant they faced deeper recessions.

Central Asian countries are predicted to be hit the worst especially poor countries Only 4% of permanently closed businesses anticipate to return in the future, with huge differences across sectors, ranging from 3% in lodging and food services to 27% in retail commerce.

At the international and national levels, however—as Helmut Ettl, head of the Austrian financial market authority, said—there is no reliable empirical data to gauge the ongoing effects of the COVID-19 disease on the economy and the environment, as this type of crisis is unprecedented. Companies that were already financially weak before the crisis are now further destabilized. All that is known, Ettl said, is that the crisis will be profound.

== Stock market ==
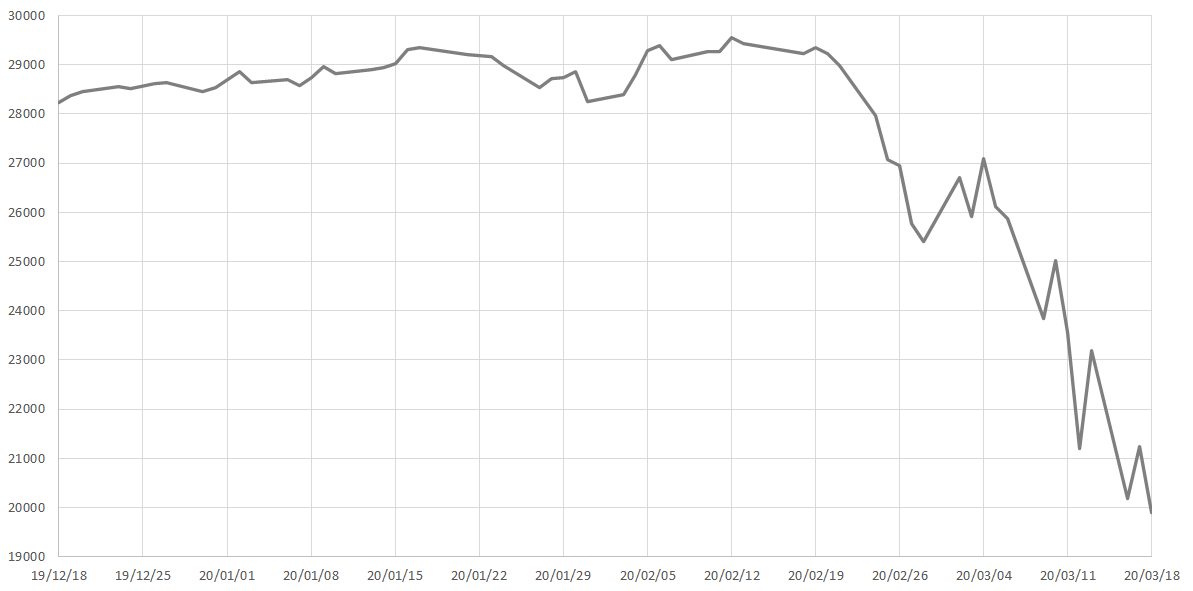
Movement of the Dow Jones Industrial Average between December 2019 and March 2020, showing the all-time high in February, and the crash in February and March during the COVID-19 pandemic

On Monday, 24 February 2020, the Dow Jones Industrial Average and FTSE 100 dropped more than 3% as the coronavirus outbreak spread worsened substantially outside of China over the weekend. This follows benchmark indices falling sharply in continental Europe after steep declines across Asia. The DAX, CAC 40, and IBEX 35 each fell by about 4%, and the FTSE MIB fell over 5%. There was a large fall in the price of oil and a large increase in the price of gold, to a 7-year high. On 27 February, due to mounting worries about the coronavirus outbreak, various U.S. stock market indices including the NASDAQ-100, the S&P 500 Index, and the Dow Jones Industrial Average posted their sharpest falls since 2008, with the Dow falling 1,191 points, its largest one-day drop since the 2008 financial crisis. On 28 February 2020, stock markets worldwide reported their largest single-week declines since the 2008 financial crisis.

Following the second week of turbulence, on 6 March, stock markets worldwide closed down (although the Dow Jones Industrial Average, NASDAQ Composite, and S&P 500 closed up on the week), while the yields on 10-year and 30-year U.S. Treasury securities fell to new record lows under 0.7% and 1.26% respectively. U.S. President Donald Trump signed into law an emergency appropriations and pandemic countermeasures bill, including $8.3 billion in government spending. After OPEC and Russia failed to agree on oil production cuts on 5 March and Saudi Arabia and Russia both announced increases in oil production on 7 March, oil prices fell by 25 percent. The role of cross-border flows of goods in the modern economy, driven by decades of falling transport costs, falling communication costs, and, until recently, falling tariffs, also had a big role to play in impacting the stock market.

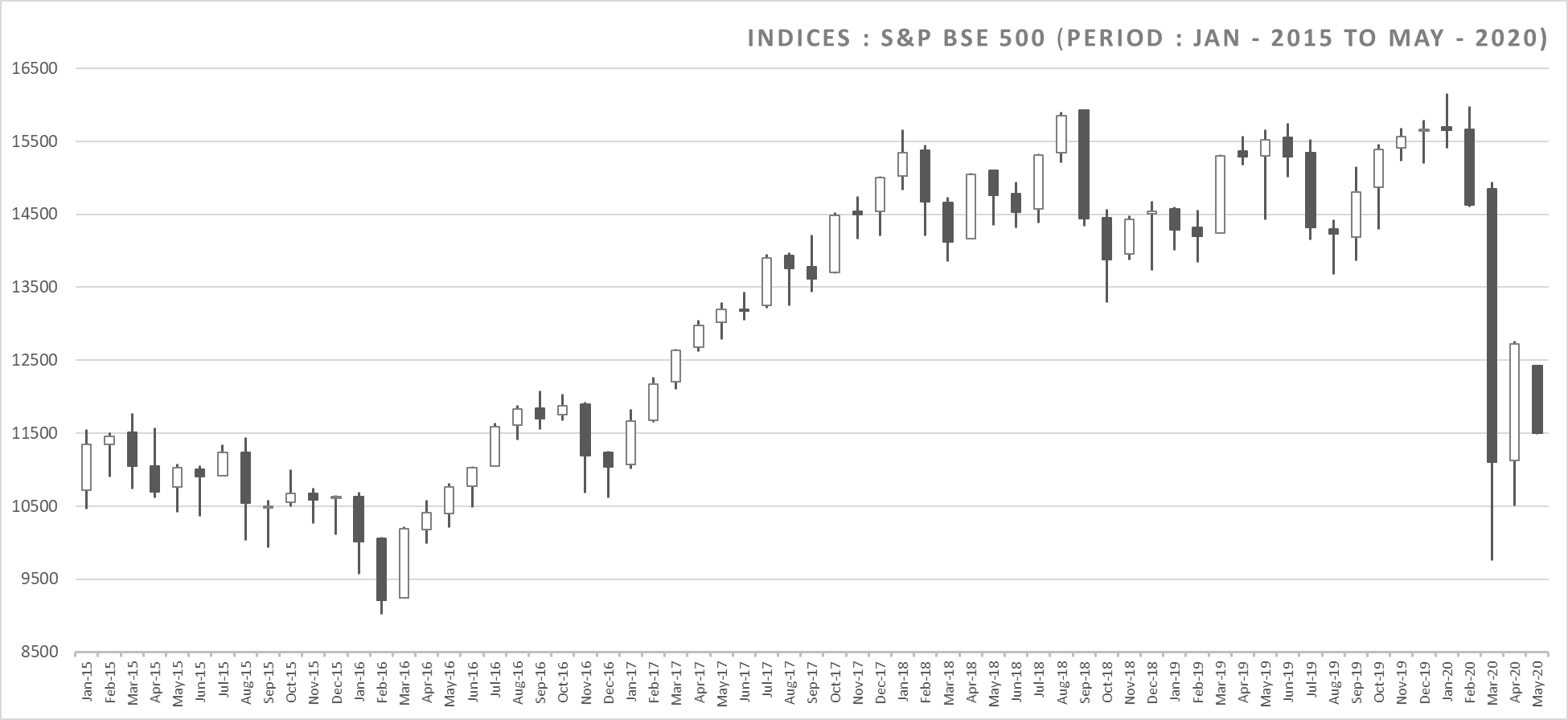
Indices: S&P BSE 500 (Period Jan – 2015 to May – 2020). Open, High, Low, Close visible. Fall depicted in black. Rise depicted in white.

Overall, stock markets declined by over 30% by March; implied volatilities of equities and oil have spiked to crisis levels, and credit spreads on non-investment grade debt have widened sharply as investors reduce risks. This heightened turmoil in global financial markets is occurring despite the substantial and comprehensive financial reforms agreed by G20 financial authorities in the post-crisis era.

=== Week of 9 March 2020 ===
On the morning of 9 March, the S&P 500 fell 7% in four minutes after the exchange opened, triggering a circuit breaker for the first time since the 2008 financial crisis and halting trading for 15 minutes. At the end of trading, stock markets worldwide saw massive declines (with the STOXX Europe 600 falling to more than 20% below its peak earlier in the year), with the Dow Jones Industrial Average eclipsing the previous one-day decline record on 27 February by falling 2,014 points (or 7.8%). The yield on 10-year and 30-year U.S. Treasury securities hit new record lows, with the 30-year securities falling below 1% for the first time in history.

On 12 March, Asia-Pacific stock markets closed down (with the Nikkei 225 of the Tokyo Stock Exchange also falling to more than 20% below its 52-week high), European stock markets closed down 11% (their worst one-day decline in history), while the Dow Jones Industrial Average closed down an additional 10% (eclipsing the one-day record set on 9 March), the NASDAQ Composite was down 9.4%, and the S&P 500 was down 9.5% (with the NASDAQ and S&P 500 also falling to more than 20% below their peaks), and the declines activated the trading curb at the New York Stock Exchange for the second time that week. Oil prices dropped by 8%, while the yields on 10-year and 30-year U.S. Treasury securities increased to 0.86% and 1.45% (and their yield curve finished normal). On 15 March, the Fed cut its benchmark interest rate by a full percentage point, to a target range of 0 to 0.25%. However, in response, futures on the S&P 500 and crude oil dropped on continued market worries. Almost 75% of the hedge funds suffered steep losses during this timeline.

== Oil prices ==
The COVID-19 pandemic and related confinement measures caused an unprecedented contraction in economic activity and a collapse in demand for oil and oil products. The result is one of the biggest price shocks the energy market experienced since the first oil shock of 1973. Oil prices dipped below US$20 (Brent Crude) a barrel, losing nearly 70% in value, with storage capacity approaching its limits (OilPrice).

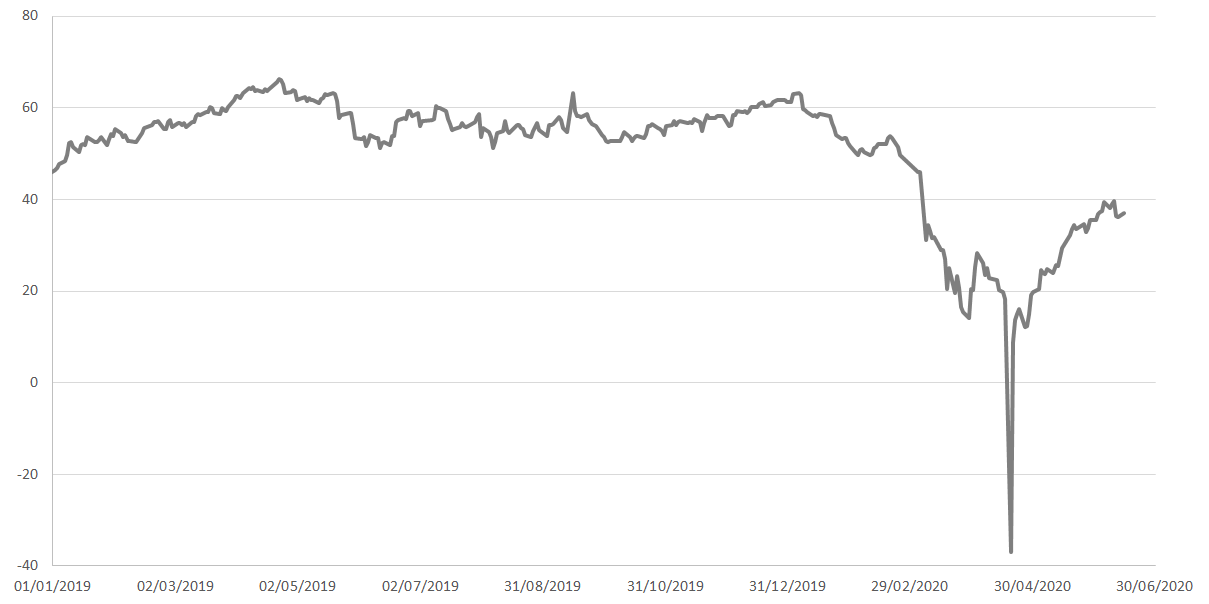
Movement of WTI price from 2019. The crash started in mid-February 2020. On 20 April 2020, prices dropped below zero for the first time in history.

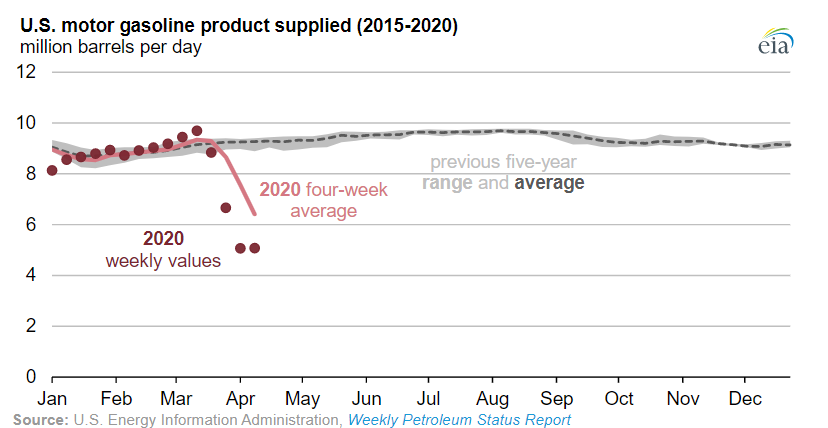
Demand for motor gasoline fell sharply in the United States

The reduction in the demand for travel and the lack of factory activity due to the outbreak significantly impacted demand for oil, causing its price to fall. In mid-February, the International Energy Agency forecasted that oil demand growth in 2020 would be the smallest since 2011. Chinese demand slump resulted in a meeting of the Organization of Petroleum Exporting Countries (OPEC) to discuss a potential cut in production to balance the loss in demand. The cartel initially made a tentative agreement to cut oil production by 1.5 million barrels per day (bpd) following a meeting in Vienna on 5 March 2020, which would bring the production levels to the lowest it has been since the Iraq War. Meanwhile, analytics firm IHS Markit predicted a fall global demand for crude to fall by 3.8 million bpd in the first quarter of 2020, largely due to the halt to Chinese economic activity due to the virus; it also predicted the first annual reduction in demand for crude since the 2008 financial crisis.

However, Russia refused to cooperate with the OPEC cuts, effectively ending the agreement it has maintained with OPEC since 2016. Russia balked as it believed that the growth of shale oil extraction in the U.S., which was not party to any agreement with OPEC, would require continued cuts for the foreseeable future. Reduced prices would also damage the U.S. shale industry by forcing prices below operating costs for many shale producers, and thus retaliate for the damage inflicted on Russian and OPEC finances. The breakdown in talks also resulted in a failure to extend the cut in output of 2.1 million bpd that was scheduled to expire at the end of March.

On 8 March 2020, Saudi Arabia unexpectedly announced that it would instead increase production of crude oil and sell it at a discount (of $6–8 a barrel) to customers in Asia, the US and Europe, following the breakdown of negotiations. Prior to the announcement, the price of oil had fallen by more than 30% since the start of the year, and upon Saudi Arabia's announcement it dropped a further 30 percent, though later recovered somewhat. Brent Crude, used to price two-thirds of the world's crude oil supplies, experienced the largest drop since the 1991 Gulf War on the night of 8 March. Also, the price of West Texas Intermediate fell to its lowest level since February 2016. Fears of the Russian–Saudi Arabian oil price war caused a plunge in U.S. stocks, and have a particular impact on American producers of shale oil. On 13 March, oil prices posted their largest single-week decline since 2008.

Plans announced on 13 March 2020 by U.S. President Donald Trump that he was directing the U.S. Department of Energy to purchase oil for the U.S. Strategic Petroleum Reserve were suspended less than two weeks later when funding for the purchase was not provided by Congress. This would have allowed the purchase of up to 92 million barrels. At the time, the Reserve held 635 million barrels with a capacity of 727 million. The Washington Post characterized this as "bail[ing] out domestic oil companies", though the effect on prices was expected to be minor in a 100 million barrel per day market.

In sharp contrast to US inaction, Australia announced on 21 April it would build a fuel reserve by purchasing $60 million worth (USD) of crude and storing it in the US SPR.

Goldman Sachs predicted on 14 March that one-third of oil and oil service companies in the U.S. would be bought by competitors or driven out of business by the low crude prices. Oil companies that filed for bankruptcy during the pandemic include Whiting Petroleum (on 1 April) and Diamond Offshore (on 27 April).

On Thursday, 9 April, OPEC, Russia and other producers tentatively agreed to the biggest oil production cuts in history. They decided to withdraw 10 million barrels per day or 10% of global production from the market for the months of May and June, a step further supported by G20 Energy Ministers.

In March 2021, the oil prices ascended as high as $71.38 a barrel. It was for the first time since 8 January 2020, the beginning of the COVID-19 pandemic. The oil prices climbed up after the Houthi rebels of Yemen attacked the Aramco oil facility of Saudi Arabia using missiles and drones.

=== Negative WTI futures (20 April 2020) ===
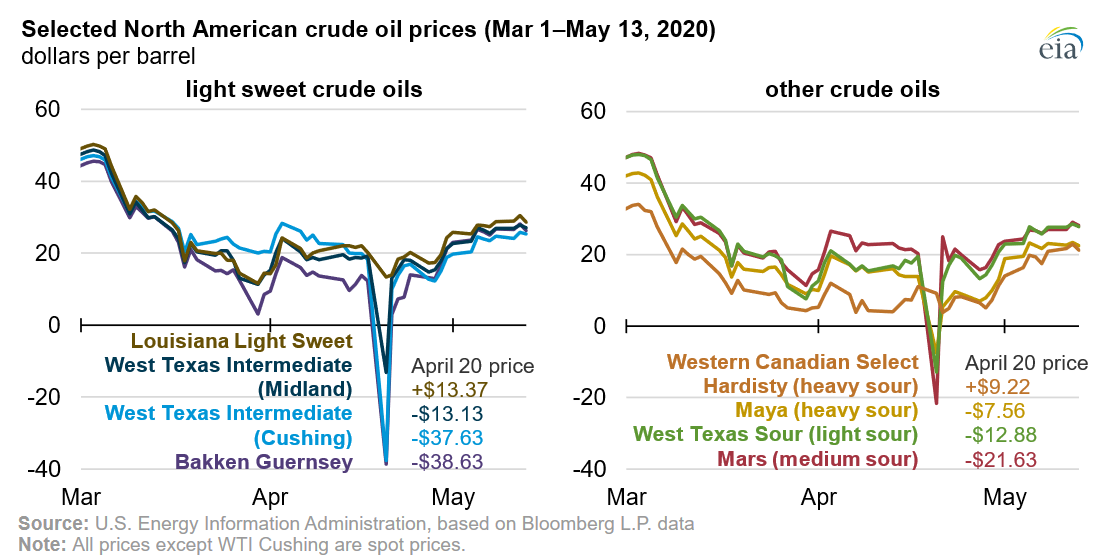
Oil prices for selected North American benchmarks in the spring of 2020

On 20 April 2020, the futures price of West Texas Intermediate crude to be delivered in May actually went negative, an unprecedented event. This was a result of uninterrupted supply and a much reduced demand, as oil storage facilities reaching their maximum capacity. Analyst characterized the event as an anomaly of the closing of the May futures market coupled with the lack of available storage in that time frame. The two previous inflation-adjusted low points for oil are $6 in 1931 during the Great Depression and Texas oil boom; and $2.50 in January and February 1862 during the American Civil War and Pennsylvania oil rush. WTI futures for May delivery recovered on the last day of trading, 21 April, ending at $10.01 a barrel. However, that day, Brent crude futures for June delivery fell 24% to $19.33 a barrel, the lowest level since 2002, while WTI June futures fell 43% to $11.57 a barrel. More than two million futures contracts were traded on 21 April, a new record. Oil industry analysts were pessimistic about near-term stability in the market; an analyst for the broker OANDA stated, "There is nothing to make energy traders believe that storage constraints, rising inventories, and demand concerns will be alleviated."

The finances of many oil-producing nations suffered severe stress. Iraq, which gets 90% of its budget from oil revenue and could profitably extract oil as long as it was above $60 a barrel, announced that it would have a $4.5 billion monthly shortfall starting in May. Other oil exporters – including Mexico, Venezuela, Ecuador, and Nigeria – are expected to contract economically or struggle to manage the fiscal fallout. Countries such as Saudi Arabia and Russia have cash reserves measured in years, but their leadership remain concerned.

== Bond and debt markets ==
Prior to the coronavirus pandemic, a massive amount of borrowing by firms with ratings just above "junk", coupled with the growth of leveraged loans, which are made to companies with significant amount of debt, created a vulnerability in the financial system. The collapse of this corporate debt bubble would potentially endanger the solvency of firms, potentially worsening the next recession. In January, new U.S. corporate debt fell 10% from the previous year, potentially indicating more caution from investors. As the economic impact of the coronavirus began to be felt, numerous financial news sources warned of the potential cascade of impacts upon the outstanding $10 trillion in corporate debt. Between mid-February and early March, investors increased the premium, or additional yield, to hold junk bonds by four times the premium demanded of higher credit lenders, indicating increased wariness.

During the 2020 stock market crash that began the week of 9 March, bond prices unexpectedly moved in the same direction as stock prices. Bonds are generally considered safer than stocks, so confident investors will sell bonds to buy stocks and cautious investors will sell stocks to buy bonds. Along with the unexpected movement of bonds in concert with stocks, bond desks reported that it had become difficult to trade many different types of bonds, including municipal bonds, corporate bonds, and even U.S. Treasury bonds. The New York Times opined that this, coupled with the fall in gold futures, indicated that major investors were experiencing a cash crunch and were attempting to sell any asset they could. As big investors sought to sell, the spread between the prices sellers and buyers wanted has widened. As banks were unable to sell the bonds they were holding, they also stopped buying bonds. As the number of traders fell, the few trades remaining wildly swung the bond prices. Market depth in Treasuries, a measure of liquidity, fell to its lowest level since the 2008 crisis. Over the week of 9 March, investors pulled a weekly record of $15.9 billion from investment-grade bond funds, as well as $11.2 billion from high-yield bond funds, the second-highest on record. Also, prices for bond exchange-traded funds began dropping below their net asset values.

On 12 March, the U.S. Fed took almost unprecedented action to, in its words, "address highly unusual disruptions in Treasury financing markets associated with the coronavirus outbreak". The Federal Reserve Bank of New York announced that it would offer $1.5 trillion in repurchase agreements in U.S. Treasury securities to smooth the functioning of the short-term market that banks use to lend to each other. The New York Fed further announced that it would buy $60 billion of Treasury bonds over the next month to keep the bond market functioning. The seizing up of markets was a critical step in the subprime mortgage crisis that led to the 2008 financial crisis and the Fed appeared to want to act quickly. On 15 March, as well as dropping interest rates, announced it would buy at least $500 billion in Treasures and at least $200 billion in government-backed mortgage securities over the next few months. On 16 March, as the stock market plunged, bond prices jumped according to their historical inverse relationship.

On 17 March, the Fed announced that they would use the Commercial Paper Funding Facility (CPFF). The CPFF was first used in the 2008 financial crisis to buy about $350 billion of commercial paper (CP), thereby increasing the amount of cash in the CP market, used by business to pay bills and other short-term demands. CP most directly affects the mortgage and auto loan markets, as well as credit to small and medium-sized businesses. The U.S. Treasury Department authorized $10 billion to backstop any losses incurred by the Fed using the Treasury's Exchange Stabilization Fund. U.S. stock markets rallied on the news.

On 19 March, the European Central Bank announced a 750 billion euro ($820 billion) bond-buying program, named the Pandemic Emergency Purchase Programme, to mitigate market turmoil. Unlike in previous ECB asset-purchases, Greek government bonds were included. Markets reacted positively, with the yield on Italian government bonds dropping to 1.542% from 2.5% the day before.

In the week of 23 March, investors attracted by Fed guarantees of market liquidity and comparatively high bond yields rushed into the U.S. corporate debt market. Investment-grade firms issued $73 billion in debt, about 21% more than the previous weekly record. Many U.S. firms sold debt in an attempt to build cash reserves in anticipation of future financial strain.

Meanwhile, Chinese corporate bond defaults fell 30% in the first quarter, year on year, as the Chinese government directed banks to supply loans to corporations to avoid defaults and job losses. Interest rates in China fell to a 14-year low due to government efforts.

On 30 March, Moody's downgraded the outlook on U.S. corporate debt from 'stable' to 'negative,' focusing in particular on the global air travel, lodging and cruise ships, automobiles, oil and gas, and the banking sectors. Fitch forecast a doubling of defaults on U.S. leverage debt from 3% in 2019 to 5–6% in 2020, with a default rate up to 20% for retail and energy companies.

=== April 2020 ===
In South Korea, the first on-shore debt offering in three weeks was successful on 9 April. However, the yields on won-denominated debt remained high amidst general pessimism about the economic outlook during the pandemic.

Following passage of the U.S. Coronavirus Aid, Relief, and Economic Security Act, the Fed announced on 9 April that it would buy up to $2.3 trillion in debt from the U.S. market, including from so-called "fallen angels," companies that were downgraded from investment-grade to junk during the chaos of March. The announcement sparked a rally in junk bond exchange-traded funds, as well as individual junk bonds. The New York Times reported on 19 April that U.S. corporations had drawn more than $200 billion from existing credit lines during the COVID-19 crisis, far more than had been extended in the 2008 crisis.

On 9 April, Saudi Arabia and Russia agreed to oil production cuts. Reuters reported that "If Saudi Arabia failed to rein in output, US senators called on the White House to impose sanctions on Riyadh, pull out US troops from the kingdom and impose import tariffs on Saudi oil."

Reporting following the May futures contracts for West Texas Intermediate crude oil falling into negative territory highlighted the financial strain on U.S. oil and oil services companies. As oil prices had plunged below the break even price for U.S. shale oil of about $40 per bbl, companies were unable to fix their finances by extracting more. MarketWatch noted that now "investors are likely to focus less on the viability of a driller’s operations and how cheaply it could unearth oil. Instead, money managers would look to assess if a company’s finances were resilient enough to stay afloat during the current economic downturn."

Virgin Australia, one of two major airlines in Australia, entered voluntary administration on 21 April, after being unable to manage $4.59 billion in debt.

Assets for companies in the U.S. car rental market, which were not included in the CARES Act, were under severe stress on 24 April. S&P Global Ratings had downgraded Avis and Hertz to "highly speculative," while credit default swaps for Hertz bonds indicated a 78% chance of default within 12 months and a 100% chance within five years.

The Bank of Japan increased its holdings of commercial paper by 27.8% in April 2020, which followed a rise of $16.9% in March. Efforts to alleviate strain on Japanese corporate finances also included increasing BoJ corporate bond holdings by 5.27% in April.

=== May 2020 ===
Between 1 January and 3 May, a record $807.1 billion of U.S. investment-grade corporate bonds were issued. Similarly, U.S. corporations sold over $300 billion in debt in April 2020, a new record. This included Boeing, which sold $25 billion in bonds, stating that it would no longer need a bailout from the U.S. government. Apple, which borrowed $8.5 billion potentially to pay back the $8 billion in debt coming due later in 2020; Starbucks, which raised $3 billion.; Ford, which sold $8 billion in junk-rated bonds despite just losing its investment rating; and cruise line operator Carnival, which increased its offering to $4 billion to meet demand. The main reasons for the lively market are the low interest rates and the Fed's actions to ensure market liquidity. The iShares iBoxx USD Investment Grade Corporate Bond, an exchange-traded fund with assets directly benefiting from Fed actions, grew by a third between 11 March and the end of April. However, companies are growing increasingly leveraged as they increase their debt while earnings fall. Through the end of April 2020, investment-grade corporate bonds gained 1.4% versus Treasury bonds' 8.9%, indicating potential investor wariness about the risk of corporate bonds. Morgan Stanley estimated 2020 U.S. investment-grade bond issuance at $1.4 trillion, around 2017's record, while Barclays estimated the non-financial corporations will need to borrow $125–175 billion in additional debt to cover the drop in earnings from the pandemic recession.

On 4 May, U.S. retailer J.Crew filed for bankruptcy protection to convert $1.6 billion in debt to equity. Its debt largely resulted from the 2011 leveraged buyout by its current owners. J.Crew became the first U.S. retailer to go bankrupt in the COVID-19 downturn. Also in the week of 4 May, the Chamber of Deputies in the National Congress of Brazil was seeking to pass an amendment to the Constitution that would allow the Brazil to buy private sector securities. However, the Central Bank was concerned that bank officials could face accusations of corruption for buying assets from individual companies and were seeking personal liability protection for Central Bank purchases.

On 12 May, the Fed began buying corporate bond ETFs for the first time in its history. It stated its intention to buy bonds directly "in the near future." As companies must prove that they can not otherwise access normal credit to be eligible for the primary market facility, analysts opined that it may create a stigma for companies and be little used. However, the guarantee of a Fed backstop appears to have ensured market liquidity.

In its annual review on 14 May, the Bank of Canada concluded that its three interest rate cuts in March and first ever bond buying program had succeeded in stabilizing Canadian markets. However, it expressed concern about the ability of the energy sector to refinance its debt given historically low oil prices. About C$17 billion in Canadian corporate bonds was sold in April 2020, one of the largest volumes since 2010.

=== June/July 2020 ===
Credit ratings for industries such as energy/oil, retail, entertainment, travel/leisure and banking were affected most heavily by the pandemic. By July 2020, S&P Global and Fitch Ratings had initiated almost as many credit downgrades as the 2008 financial crisis. Canada was the first country to lose its triple "A" credit rating in June 2020.

=== August 2020 ===
The sudden economic disruptions caused by the pandemic led to a significant increase in government debt as governments around the world implemented stimulus measures to support their economies. This resulted in a surge in demand for government bonds, pushing bond prices up and yields down. At the same time, the uncertainty and volatility in financial markets led to a flight to safety, with investors increasingly turning to safe-haven assets such as bonds. This also contributed to the decline in bond yields. In addition, the downturn in the global economy and the drop in interest rates made it more difficult for businesses to access credit, leading to a decrease in corporate bond issuance. This, in turn, contributed to overall market volatility and uncertainty.

== 2021 ==
On 26 November 2021, worry about the potential economic impact of the Omicron variant led to a drop in global markets, including the worst drop of the Dow Jones Industrial Average in 2021, led by travel-related stocks. The price of Brent Crude and West Texas Intermediate oil fell 10% and 11.7%, respectively Cryptocurrency markets were also routed. and the South African rand also hit an all-time low for 2021, trading at over 16 rand to the dollar, losing 6% of its value in November.

In early December 2021, Jerome Powell, the chairman of the Federal Reserve, testified before the U.S. Senate Committee on Banking that "The recent rise in COVID-19 cases and the emergence of the Omicron variant pose downside risks to employment and economic activity and increased uncertainty for inflation."

== See also ==
- Economic impact of the COVID-19 pandemic
- Impact of the COVID-19 pandemic on education
- Impact of the COVID-19 pandemic on religion
- Impact of the COVID-19 pandemic on politics
- Impact of the COVID-19 pandemic on sports
- Impact of the COVID-19 pandemic on science and technology
- Impact of the COVID-19 pandemic on cinema
