= Encap =

Encap may refer to:

- EnCap, a proposal to build golf courses and homes on remediated landfills in the New Jersey Meadowlands
- EnCap Investments, an American private equity firm
- Encap Package Management System
- Euro NCAP, a European car safety performance assessment programme
