= Oil glut =

Oil glut may refer to:

- 1980s oil glut
- 2010s oil glut
