= Susan Cunningham =

Susan Cunningham may refer to:

- Susan M. Cunningham, Canadian geologist
- Susan Jane Cunningham (1842–1921), American mathematician
- Susan Cunningham (Coronation Street), a character on the soap opera Coronation Street
