= Chord Energy =

US Energy Company

Chord Energy Corporation
- Type: Public
- Traded as: Nasdaq: CHRD; S&P 400 component
- Industry: Petroleum industry
- Predecessors: Oasis Petroleum; Whiting Petroleum
- Founded: July 1, 2022; 4 years ago
- Headquarters: Houston, Texas, U.S.
- Key people: Susan M. Cunningham (Chair); Daniel E. Brown (President & CEO); Richard N. Robuck (CFO)
- Products: Petroleum; Natural gas
- Production output: 232 thousand barrels of oil equivalent (1,420,000 GJ) per day (2024)
- Revenue: ▼US$4.88 billion (2025)
- Net income: ▼US$44.5 million (2025)
- Number of employees: 762 (2024)
- Website: chordenergy.com

Chord Energy Corporation is a company engaged in hydrocarbon exploration and hydraulic fracturing in the Williston Basin in North Dakota and Montana. It is organized in Delaware and headquartered in Houston, Texas, with an office in Williston, North Dakota. The company was formerly known as Oasis Petroleum.

As of December 31, 2024, the company had proved reserves of 883 million barrels of oil equivalent (5.40×10^{9} GJ), of which 57% was petroleum, 19% was natural gas liquids, and 24% was natural gas.

== History ==
Oasis Petroleum logo

In February 2007, Oasis Petroleum was founded by Thomas B. Nusz and Taylor L. Reid and was financed by EnCap Investments. In June 2007, the company acquired 175,000 net acres and 1 thousand barrels of oil equivalent (6,100 GJ) per day of production in Williston, North Dakota for $83 million.

In 2008–2009, the company acquired an additional 131,000 net acres and 1.1 thousand barrels of oil equivalent (6,700 GJ) per day of production nearby for $54 million.

In 2010, the company became a public company via an initial public offering which raised over $400 million.

In 2013, the company acquired 161,000 net acres in the Williston Basin for $1.5 billion.

In 2016, the company acquired 55,000 net acres and 226 gross operated drilling locations in the Williston Basin from SM Energy for $785 million.

In 2017, the company completed the corporate spin-off of its midstream operations. The same year, Oasis Petroleum acquired 20,300 net acres in the Delaware Basin for $946 million. It sold these assets in 2021.

In September 2020, the company filed for Chapter 11 bankruptcy; it emerged from bankruptcy in November 2020.

In July 2022, the company merged with Whiting Petroleum and was renamed Chord Energy.

In May 2024, the company acquired Enerplus for $3.7 billion in cash and stock.
