= 2010s oil glut =

Oversupply of oil in the 2010s

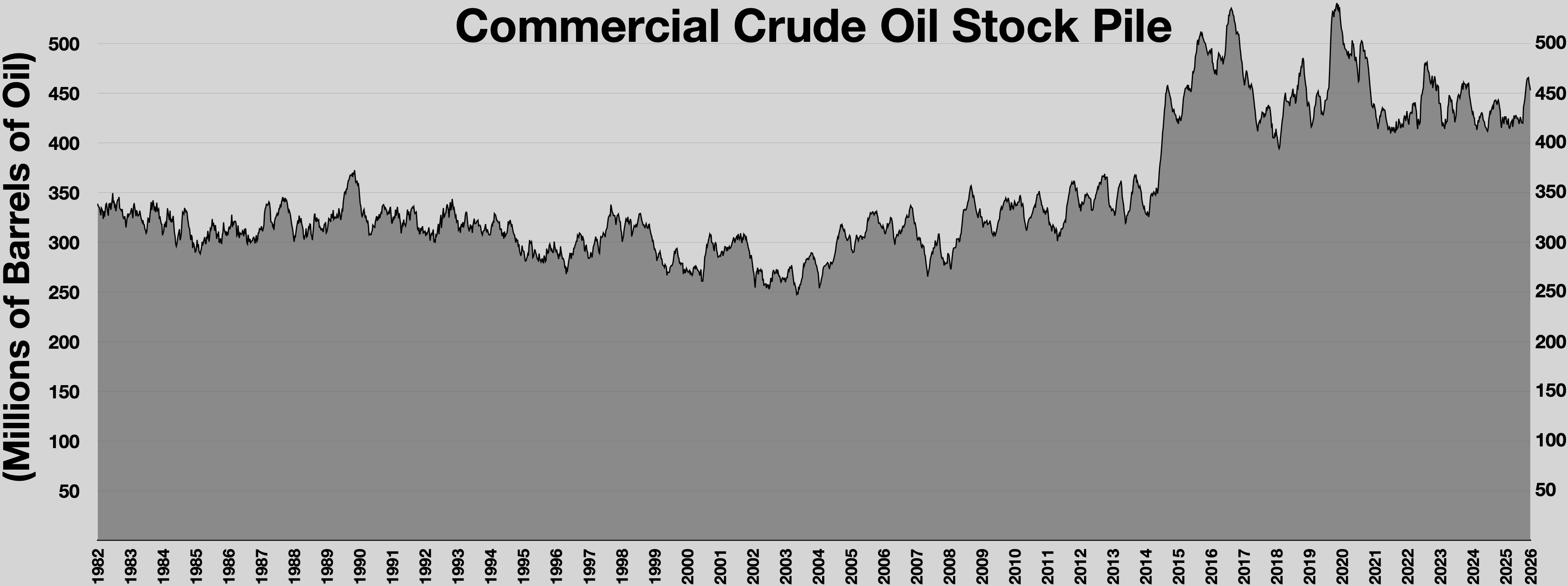
Commercial crude oil stock pile (United States) Large build in stock in late 2014

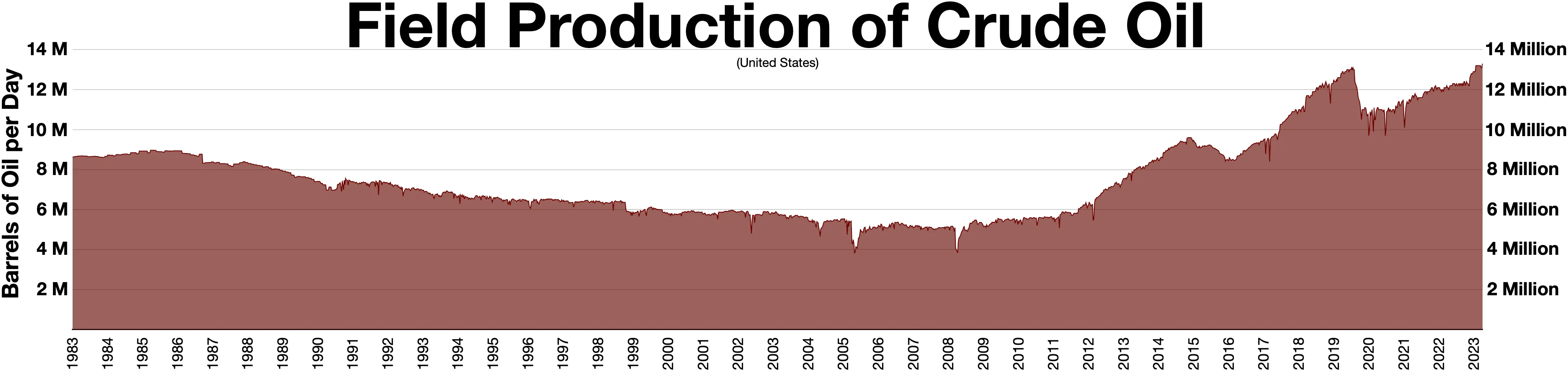
Crude oil production in the United States increased from about 6 million barrels of oil a day in 2011 to almost 10 million barrels of oil a day in late 2014

A significant surplus of crude oil started in 2014–2015 and accelerated in 2016, with multiple causes. They include general oversupply as unconventional US and Canadian tight oil (shale oil) production reached critical volumes, geopolitical rivalries among oil-producing nations, falling demand across commodities markets due to the deceleration of the Chinese economy, and possible restraint of long-term demand as environmental policy promotes fuel efficiency and steers an increasing share of energy consumption away from fossil fuels.

The world price of oil was above US$125 per barrel ($790/m^{3}) in 2012, and remained relatively strong above $100 until September 2014, after which it entered a sharp downward spiral, falling below $30 by January 2016. OPEC production was poised to rise further with the lifting of international sanctions against Iran, at a time when markets already appeared to be oversupplied by at least 2 million barrels (320,000 m^{3}) per day.

In December 2015, The Daily Telegraph quoted a major oil broker saying, "The world is floating in oil. The numbers we are facing now are dreadful." Forbes magazine said, "The ongoing oil price slump has more or less morphed into a complete rout, with profound long-term implications for the industry as a whole."

As 2016 continued, the price gradually rose back into the $40s, with the world waiting to see if and when and how the market would return to balance.

In October 2018, Brent prices had recovered to their pre-2015 levels, peaking at $86.29 a barrel on 3 October. Soon after, however, prices began a collapse as fears over the global economy and fast-increasing shale production began to take hold.

In the following month, Brent prices fell approximately 22%, constituting the largest monthly loss in a decade, ending the month at $59.46 per barrel on 30 November.

In early 2022, Brent prices had recovered to their pre-2015 levels for a second time, exceeding the prices reached in October 2018.

== Unsustainable prices ==
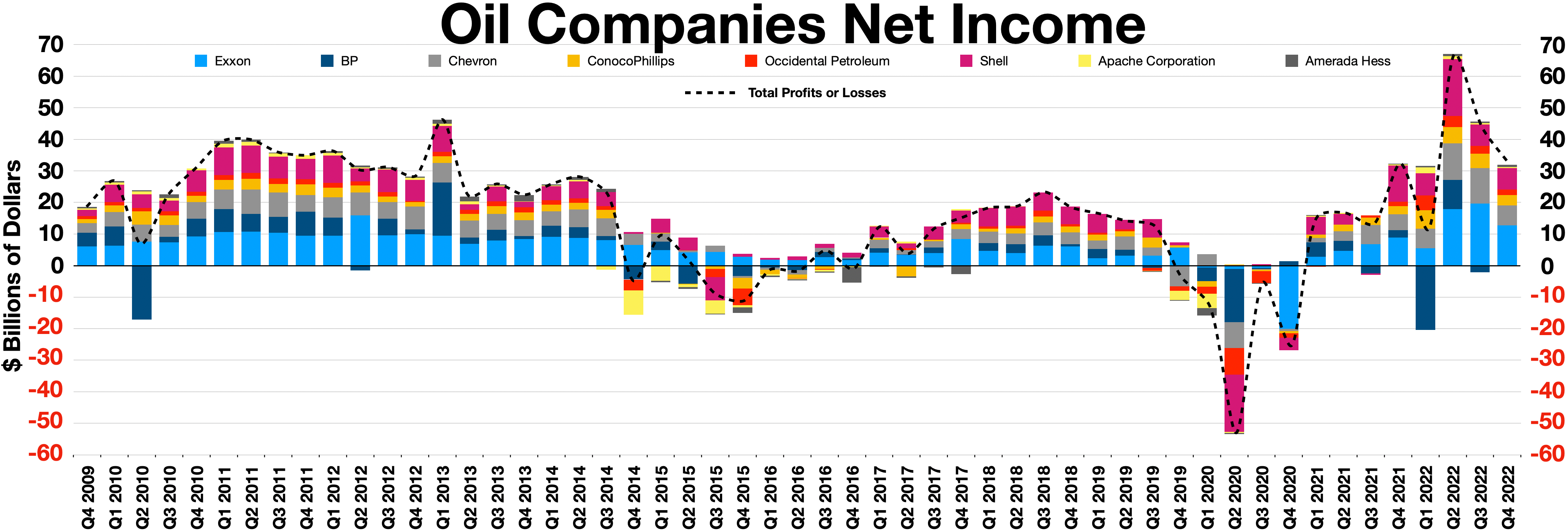
Top 8 oil companies quarterly net income or net loss (2009–2022)

The global economy after the Great Recession was particularly weak compared to before. In 2006, over 100 nations achieved economic growth over 5% annually; in 2014, roughly 50 nations achieved over 5% growth. Many large economies, like the EU, US and China, were unable to support 2005 levels of growth, and China almost fell into its own financial crisis during its 2015 stock market bubble and crash. Oil demand growth, as a result of all this, dropped.

On 6 April 2014, the economist Nicolas J. Firzli, writing in a Saudi Arabian journal World Pensions Forum, warned that the escalating oversupply could have durably negative economic consequences for all Gulf Cooperation Council member states. "...the price of oil has stabilized at a relatively high level (around $100 a barrel) unlike all previous recessionary cycles since 1980 (start of First Persian Gulf War). But nothing guarantees such price levels in perpetuity.

== Causes ==
=== North American oil production increases ===
U.S. oil production nearly doubled from 2008 levels, due to substantial improvements in shale "fracking" technology in response to record oil prices. The steady rise in additional output, mostly from North Dakota, West Texas, New Mexico, Oklahoma and several other US states eventually led to a plunge in U.S. oil import requirements and a record high volume of worldwide oil inventories in storage.

Canada also significantly increased oil production during the 2000s oil crisis, mostly in Alberta in the form of the Athabasca oil sands, though a transportation and logistics crisis in Alberta has slowed continued growth in supplies.

=== Global growth slowing ===
The 2015–16 Chinese stock market turbulence slowed the growth of the economy in China, restraining its demand for oil and other industrial commodities. China's fast rising debt pile, especially since 2008, has also led to concerns about a Chinese financial crisis and/or Chinese recession, which led to significant volatility and loss of asset value in other world markets.

China's slowing economy led to many other economies slowing or falling into recession, and the end of Quantitative Easing in the United States also contributed. Many developing nations borrowed heavily in foreign currencies, which has fueled worries over a balance of payments crisis or debt defaults.

=== Geopolitical rivalries ===
In spite of longstanding geopolitical rivalries – notably the GCC bloc versus Iran and Venezuela – emerging markets oil producers within and outside OPEC maintained at least some output discipline until the fall of 2014, when Saudi Arabia advocated higher OPEC production and lower price levels to erode the profitability of high-cost shale oil production.

It has been suggested that the Iran–Saudi Arabia proxy conflict was a powerful influence in the Saudi decision to launch the price war, as was Cold War rivalry between the United States and Russia. Larry Elliott argued that "with the help of its Saudi ally, Washington is trying to drive down the oil price by flooding an already weak market with crude. As the Russians and the Iranians are heavily dependent on oil exports, the assumption is that they will become easier to deal with." The vice president of Russia's largest oil company, Rosneft, accused Saudi Arabia of conspiring against Russia.

Some geoeconomics experts have argued that the Saudi – Qatari rivalry has shattered the semblance of unity that may have existed among fossil fuel producers. Firzli wrote, "What we're witnessing here is a fight to the death between the world's leading oil and natural gas producers at a time when fossil fuel prices are collapsing across the board."

=== Combating climate change ===
The environmental impacts of fossil fuels, especially oil, led to government policies promoting the use of zero-carbon energy sources to prevent or slow climate change. Future action on such environmental concerns, ranging from climate change to smog, has severely hurt the notion that oil demand would forever rise. The EU implemented a bloc-wide carbon tax; many nations increased gas taxes and/or passed a carbon tax. Alternative energy sources, such as wind and solar, were being subsidized to support their use.

One commentator has said that the "energy revolution" has forced oil producers with large reserves to produce as much of their reserves as fast as possible, while oil still has energy value. Oil exporters are "unable to sit on their reserves to attempt a higher price tomorrow."

== Effects ==
=== Venezuela ===
Under Hugo Chávez and his Bolivarian government, PDVSA resources were used to fund social programmes, with Chávez treating it like it had a surplus. His social policies resulted in overspending that caused shortages in Venezuela and allowed the inflation rate to grow to one of the highest rates in the world.

According to Cannon, the state income from oil revenue grew "from 51% of total income in 2000 to 56% 2006"; oil exports increased "from 77% in 1997 ... to 89% in 2006"; and his administration's dependence on petroleum sales was "one of the chief problems facing the Chávez government". By 2008, exports of everything but oil "collapsed" and, in 2012, the World Bank explained that Venezuela's economy is "extremely vulnerable" to changes in oil prices since in 2012. "96% of the country's exports and nearly half of its fiscal revenue" relied on oil production. When oil prices dropped in 2014, this worsened the crisis that Venezuela was experiencing from the government's mismanagement. Venezuela's economic crisis has been called "the worst economic collapse outside of war since World War II".

=== Cuba ===
Immediately after the death of Hugo Chávez, President Raul Castro sought a new benefactor as the oil that was shipped from Venezuela to Cuba began to slow. With Cuba needing new support, relations between the United States and Cuba began to be re-established in 2014 during United States–Cuban Thaw.

However, in 2016, Cuba still relied on Venezuela's oil and economic assistance. With Cuba's economy slowing as a result of Venezuela's own crisis, many Cubans feared that their nation would soon return to having similar experiences to that of the Special Period, which occurred following the dissolution of the Soviet Union, which Cuba heavily relied on.

=== OPEC ===
The Organization of Petroleum Exporting Countries has been severely affected by the 2014 collapse in prices. Shale production robbed OPEC of a large portion of its market power, forcing it to co-operate with other producers to keep prices up after Saudi Arabia effectively declared defeat in the price war in 2016.

Many OPEC members, such as Venezuela, Algeria, Libya, Iraq, Ecuador and Nigeria, have had internal crises spawned or worsened by the collapse in oil revenues. In many of these nations, the response to the 2011 Arab Spring was spending oil money for internal stability, which has caused financial troubles for them as oil revenue dried up.

== See also ==
- 1980s oil glut
- 2000s energy crisis
- 2020 Russia–Saudi Arabia oil price war
- 2021–2023 global energy crisis
- Arab Spring
- Libyan Civil War
- 2017–2018 Iranian protests
- 2019–2021 Algerian protests
- Petroleum politics
