= 2020 Russia–Saudi Arabia oil price war =

Flags of Russia (left) and Saudi Arabia (right)

On 8 March 2020, Saudi Arabia initiated a price war on oil with Russia, which facilitated a 65% quarterly fall in the price of oil. The price war was triggered by a break-up in dialogue between the Organization of the Petroleum Exporting Countries (OPEC) and Russia over proposed oil-production cuts in the midst of the COVID-19 pandemic. Russia walked out of the agreement, leading to the fall of the OPEC+ alliance.

Prior to the beginning of the price war, oil prices had already fallen 30% since the start of 2020 due to a drop in demand. In the first few weeks of March, US oil prices fell by 34%, crude oil fell by 26%, and Brent oil fell by 24%. The price war was one of the major causes and effects of the ensuing 2020 stock market crash.

In early April 2020 and again in June 2020, Saudi Arabia and Russia agreed to oil production cuts. The price of oil became negative on 20 April. Though oil production can be slowed, it can not be stopped completely, and even the lowest possible production level resulted in greater supply than demand. As such, those holding oil futures became willing to pay to offload contracts for oil they expected to be unable to store, resulting in enormous profit.

== Background ==
Beginning in 2014, U.S. shale oil production increased its market share; as other producers continued producing oil, prices crashed from above $114 per barrel in 2014 to about $27 in 2016. In September 2016, Saudi Arabia and Russia agreed to cooperate in managing the price of oil, creating an informal alliance of OPEC and non-OPEC producers that was dubbed "OPEC+". By January 2020, OPEC+ had cut oil production by 2.1 million barrels per day (bpd), with Saudi Arabia making the largest reductions in production.

As a result of the COVID-19 pandemic, factory output and transportation demand fell, bringing overall demand for oil down as well, and causing oil prices to fall. On 15 February 2020, the International Energy Agency forecasted that demand growth would fall to the lowest rate since 2011, with full-year growth falling by 325,000 barrels per day to 825,000 barrels per day, and a first quarter contraction in consumption by 435,000 barrels per day. Although demand for oil was falling globally, a drop in demand in China's markets, the largest since 2008, triggered an OPEC summit in Vienna on 5 March 2020. At the summit, OPEC agreed to cut oil production by an additional 1.5 million barrels per day through the second quarter of the year (a total production cut of 3.6 million bpd from the original 2016 agreement), with the group expected to review the policy on 9 June during their next meeting. OPEC called on Russia and other non-OPEC members of OPEC+ to abide by the OPEC decision. On 6 March 2020, Russia rejected the demand, marking the end of the unofficial partnership, with oil prices falling 10% after the announcement.

Earlier in February 2020, the Trump administration had put sanctions on Russia's largest oil company Rosneft. Russia may have seen the oil war as a way to retaliate against U.S. sanctions, some media outlets claim.

== Contrary views on a price war ==
Russian and Saudi officials both denied the existence of a price war against each other or any other country. Russian Presidential Press Secretary Dmitry Peskov said that new planned contracts could be implemented immediately if necessary. During the negotiations, Russian officials argued that it was too early for cuts before understanding the full impact the virus outbreak has on oil prices, and that an existing shortfall of about one million barrels a day, caused by the political turmoil in Libya, was helping to offset a slump in demand at the time.

Pavel Sorokin from the Russian Ministry of Energy doubted that the cuts would work with stating following quotes: "We cannot fight a falling demand situation when there is no clarity about where the bottom is." "It is very easy to get caught in a circle when, by cutting once, you get into an even... worse situation in say two weeks: oil prices would shortly bounce back before falling again as demand continued to fall." when asked in interviews. More reports confirm the Russian side made a proposal to extend the current OPEC+ combined cuts of 1.7 million barrels per day for at least 3 months, in order to assess the real impact the coronavirus crisis has on oil demand before more cuts, with OPEC refusing ultimately.

== Events ==
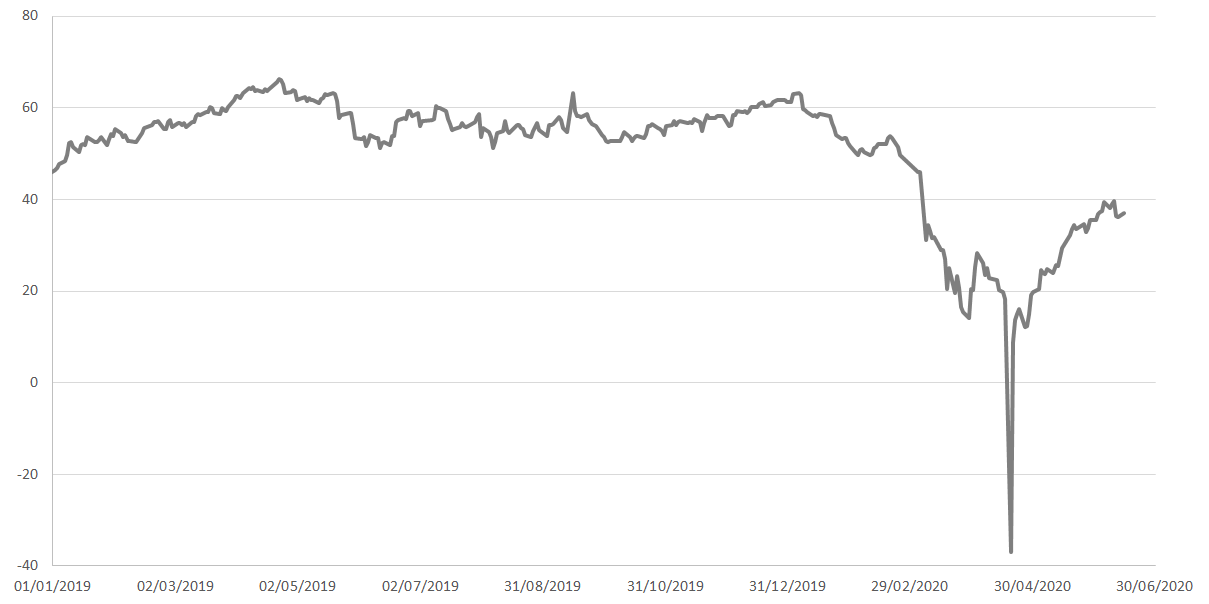
Movement of WTI price from 2019. On 20 April 2020, prices dropped below zero for the first time.

On 8 March 2020, Saudi Arabia announced unexpected price discounts of $8 to $6 per barrel to customers in Europe, Asia, and the United States. The announcement triggered a free fall in oil prices and other consequences that day, with brent crude falling by 30%, the largest drop since the Gulf War. The West Texas Intermediate, a grade of crude oil used as a benchmark in oil pricing fell 20%. On 9 March 2020, stock markets worldwide reported major losses thanks in part to a combination of price war and fears over the coronavirus pandemic. Effects were felt outside of oil prices and stock markets as well; following the announcement, the Russian ruble fell 7% to a 4-year low against the U.S. dollar. In the days after the announcement, oil prices and markets recovered somewhat, with oil prices increasing by 10%, and most stock markets recovering the day after Black Monday. On 10 March, Saudi Arabia announced that it would increase its production from 9.7 million barrels per day to 12.3 million, while Russia planned to increase oil production by 300,000 barrels per day. At the time, Aramco's short term oil production capacity was around 12 million bpd (sustained at 10.5 million bpd), and the firm has been instructed to expand this to 13 million.

As demand continued to fall dramatically, oil prices went down further, reaching a 17-year low on 18 March where Brent was priced at $24.72 a barrel and WTI at $20.48 a barrel.

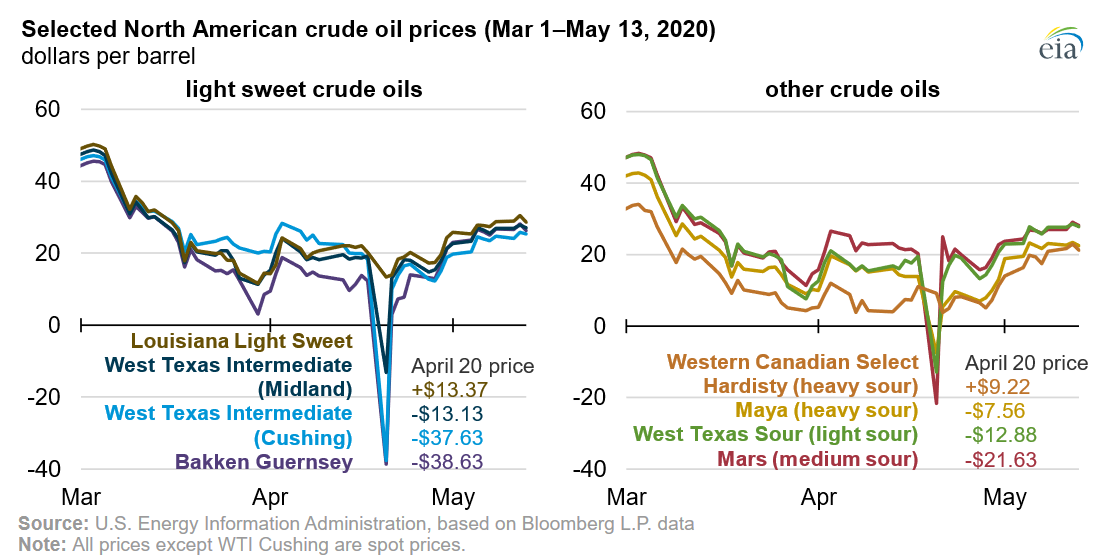
Oil prices for selected North American benchmarks in the spring of 2020

Oil prices remained depressed for the rest of March. On 2 April, U.S. President Donald Trump, after significant internal pressure, called Saudi Arabian crown prince Mohammed bin Salman, threatening to withdraw U.S. military support if OPEC and its allies did not cut oil production. The following day, Russian President Vladimir Putin ordered energy minister Alexander Novak to prepare an extraordinary OPEC meeting and stated that global production could be cut by 10 million barrels. In response to Putin's statement, oil prices jumped. Even with a 10 million bpd cut, the International Energy Agency estimated that global oil stockpiles would still increase by 15 million bpd. IEA's director, Fatih Birol, stated that 50 million jobs related to oil refining and retail was at risk globally. US oil prices increased by 25% on 2 April, the biggest one-day increase in history. Brent oil increased to $32 on 3 April.

Later on 3 April, Saudi foreign and energy ministers released statements criticising Putin, blaming Russia for not taking part in the OPEC+ agreement.

On 9 April, Russia and Saudi Arabia agreed to oil production cuts. Reuters reported that "If Saudi Arabia failed to rein in output, US senators called on the White House to impose sanctions on Riyadh, pull out US troops from the kingdom and impose import tariffs on Saudi oil."

OPEC expected demand to fall by 6.8 million bpd, later to reduce by up to 35 million bpd. On 9 April, OPEC and Russia agreed to reduce by 10 million bpd. USA expected its production to fall by 2 million bpd at the end of the year. OPEC requested Mexico to cut by 400,000 bpd. Mexico proposed to cut its oil production by 100,000 bpd for two months, from 1.781 mbd to 1.681 mbd.

The WTI delivery price difference between months resulted in unusually high contango; purchasing cheap physical oil to storage for later sale.

On 20 April the price of WTI oil for May delivery (expiring on 21 April) fell into negative territory (-$37/bbl) for the first time in recorded history due to depressed demand and insufficient storage capacity, particularly at the WTI measuring location in Cushing, Oklahoma where pipelines meet and working capacity is around 76 million barrels (technical storage capacity is 92 million barrels). On 24 April, Cushing reached nearly 64 million barrels, or 81% of capacity. Gasoline prices also fell. 104 oil tankers came to U.S. shores to offload more oil.

While WTI fell on 20 April, some Canadian oil fell to $0, shutting down some production, and Brent oil fell to $18/bbl.

A trial for market manipulation is ongoing against Vega Capital London Ltd, a group of nine independent traders at Essex, who would buy oil futures with the expectation to win if the price went down by the end of the contract. However, they are accused of doing so by deliberately buying large volumes and coordinating their activities to artificially push down the price. It is estimated that on April 20 they traded more than BP, Glencore, and JPMorgan Chase at around 29.2% of the total volume in WTI crude oil futures, and that their trades were correlated between 96.2% and 99.7%. It is estimated that they made around $660 million altogether in just a few hours. The trial is anticipated to last at least until 2025.

== Impact ==
External image
- Chart of oil prices per barrel needed for OPEC countries to balance their budgets

Oil revenue is a significant government income for several oil producing countries. Low oil price put pressure on state financials.

=== On Saudi Arabia ===
Saudi Aramco announced a cut in capital expenditures from $35–40 billion planned to $25–30 billion. The government also increased its debt ceiling from 30 to 50 percent of GDP, due to both oil prices and the impact of the pandemic, and planned to cut its spending by 5 percent as its budget deficit was expected to increase from 6 to 9 percent.

=== On Russia ===
The Russian government had initially forecast that it would run a surplus of 930 billion roubles ($11.4 billion) in 2020, but following the outbreak of the price war stated that it expected to run at a deficit. The ruble has dropped, having fallen over 30 percent between the start of 2020 and 18 March.

=== On the stock markets ===
Prior to opening on 9 March 2020 (Monday), the Dow Jones Industrial Average futures market fell over 1,300 points and suspended trading as a result due to a combination of coronavirus concerns and the oil price war. On Monday, 9 March 2020, stock markets globally experienced major point drops due to a combination of panic over the COVID-19 pandemic and the price war between Saudi Arabia and Russia. The Dow Jones fell over 2,000 points, or 7.8%, exceeding the futures market prediction and becoming the largest point drop in its history. Other stock markets were similarly affected, with the S&P 500 contracting by 7.6% and the NASDAQ Composite contracting by 7.2%. Italy's FTSE MIB suffered the largest drop in percentage, with the index falling 11%. In the United States, the drops triggered circuit breakers designed to prevent stock market crashes, leading to 15-minute pauses in trading.

=== On other producers ===
In response to the drop in price, multiple oil producers in North America cut the drilling of new wells. Shale oil producers in North America generally require oil prices above $40 per barrel to sustain operations, and the cuts in new oilfields is expected to nullify the expected growth in US oil production. At $35 per barrel of crude oil, only 16 shale producers could operate new wells profitably, and most producers had expected a per barrel price of $55–65 in 2020. Consultancy firm Wood Mackenzie estimated that with Brent at $25/barrel, 10% of oil production globally would not be able to cover its base operating cost, particularly heavy crude oil producers such as Venezuela, Mexico and oil sands in Canada, where the price dipped below $5 per barrel. The U.S. Energy Information Administration forecasts show that U.S. crude oil production would fall from 13.2 million bpd in May 2020 to 12.8 million bpd in December 2020 due to the price war, and would then fall to 12.7 million bpd in 2021.

In the US, Whiting Petroleum Corporation, which produced 120,000 barrels per day, was the first major producer to declare bankruptcy due to the oil price crash. Diamond Offshore Drilling, an offshore drilling contractor, also filed for bankruptcy, citing the price war and the drop in oil demand due to the coronavirus pandemic.

Iraqi and Kuwaiti oil producers also announced price discounts to their buyers, though Iraq's discount was lower than that of Saudi Arabia's. The United Arab Emirates also announced an increase in production to 4 million barrels per day, higher than the country's estimated output capacity of 3.5 million bpd. Saad al-Kaabi, Qatar's minister of state for energy affairs, described the price war as a "very big mistake" in a June 2020 interview.

Norway, Europe's largest oil exporter, saw a drop in its currency to historic lows against the Euro, with the Norwegian Central Bank preparing a currency intervention for the first time in two decades. Nigeria's Central Bank also devalued its naira against the dollar, while the country's stock market and bond prices (alongside Angola's) fell.

== See also ==
- 2020 stock market crash
- Economic impact of the COVID-19 pandemic
- Russia–Saudi Arabia relations
- 1973 oil crisis
- 1980s oil glut
- 2010s oil glut
- 2021–2023 global energy crisis
- Petroleum politics
