= Susan M. Cunningham =

Canadian geologist

Susan Margaret Cunningham (born 1956) is a Canadian geologist and management figure in the global oil and gas industry. Cunningham has worked in the petroleum field since 1980, occupying various exploration and development roles within Amoco, Statoil ASA, and Noble Energy Inc. Her career has focused on the management of resource exploration projects in West Africa and the Deepwater Gulf of Mexico. Cunningham is a member of the board of directors of Chord Energy. Over the span of her career, Cunningham has been recognized for exemplary leadership ability and professional achievement by organizations not limited to the National Diversity Council and the ASME (American Society of Mechanical Engineers).

== Education ==
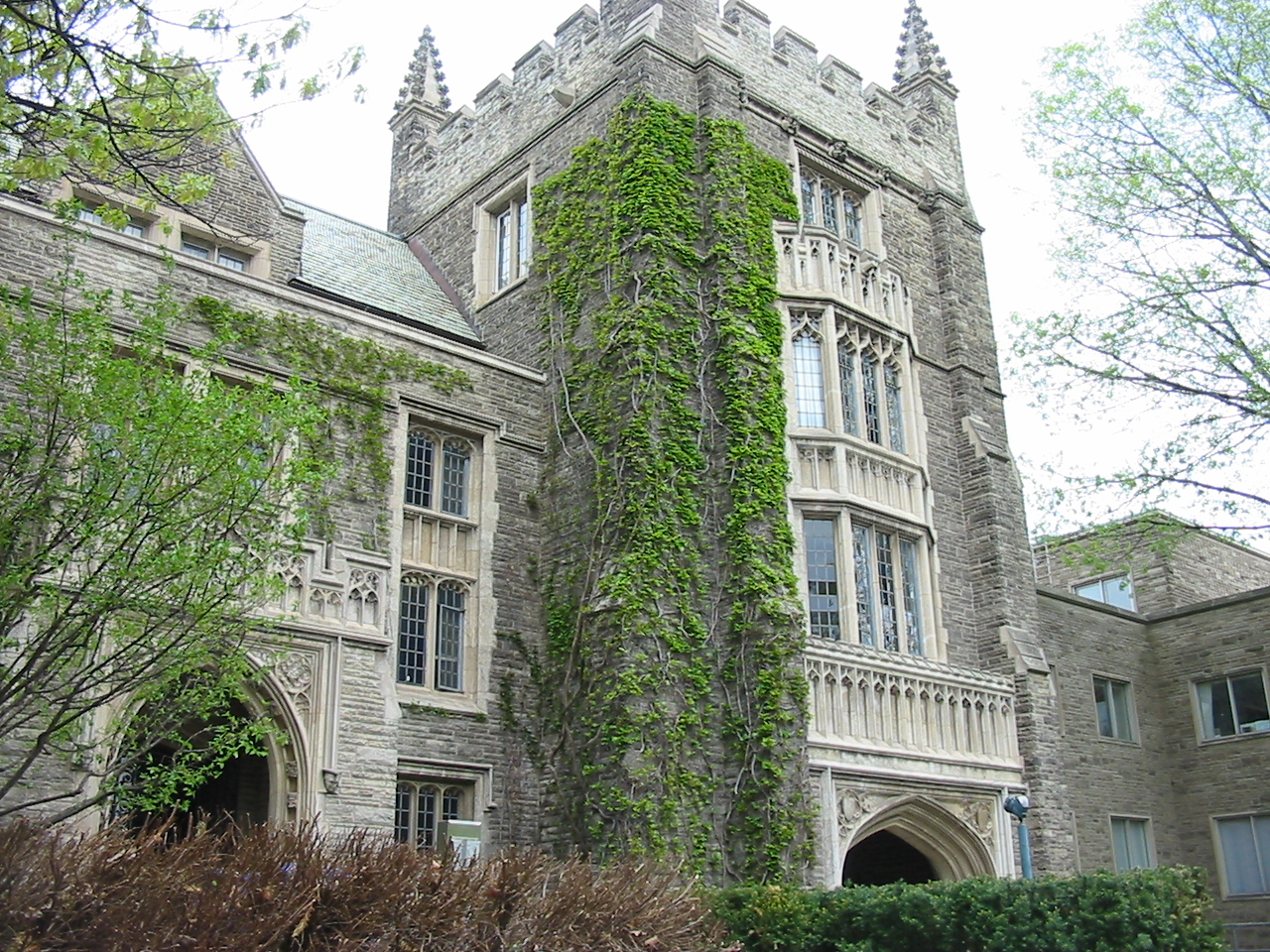
University Hall in McMaster University, Hamilton Ontario

Graduating in 1979, Cunningham holds a BSc in Geology and Physical Geology from McMaster University in Ontario, Canada. To fulfil the requirements of her undergraduate degree, Cunningham authored a research paper in her final year titled "Petrology and Geochemistry of Some Archean Volcanics, Dome Township, Central Red Lake Area, Ontario." Her research for this project was facilitated by the Ontario Geological Survey, who aided the collection of data and samples as well as the chemical analysis involved in testing her samples, completed in 1998.

Cunningham later completed a management program through Rice University's Office of Executive Development in Houston, Texas.

== Career ==
=== 1980–1997 ===
In 1980, Cunningham was employed by Amoco Corp where she occupied various exploration and development positions until 1997. Among them were managing director of Denmark and Sweden, and exploration manager of Deepwater Gulf of Mexico. Cunningham was the company's first female country manager and first female domestic exploration manager in the deepwater Gulf of Mexico.

=== 1997–2000 ===
Cunningham began working for the Norwegian energy company, Statoil ASA in 1997, where she took on the role of exploration manager of South Africa, and in 1998 returned to working with the Deepwater Gulf of Mexico as Statoil's Vice President of exploration. In 1999, her final year working for Statoil, she served as Vice President of West African Exploration before becoming Vice Present of core worldwide explorations at Texaco Inc in 2000.

=== 2001–2017 ===
After leaving Texaco in 2001, Cunningham took on the role of Senior Vice President of Exploration with Noble Energy Inc in the same year. Between 2001 and 2014, Cunningham occupied numerous senior management positions within the company, including Senior Vice President of the Gulf of Mexico, West Africa, and Frontiers. In addition, she established Noble Energy's business and innovation department, which she also oversaw. In 2014, she was promoted further to Executive Vice President of EHSR (Environment, Health, Safety, Regulatory) and New Frontiers, which encompassed global exploration, Geoscience, frontier, and new ventures, a position in which she remained until 2017.

While working with Noble Energy, Cunningham was also active in other organizations. From 2005 and 2014, Cunningham was a member of the board at Cliff's Natural Resources and from 2010 to 2011, was the Chair of the Offshore Technology Conference (OTC) as a representative of the American Association of Petroleum Geologists (AAPG). In addition she served on the boards of both the Houston Area Women's Center and the Houston Geological Society.

=== 2017–present ===
In 2017, Cunningham was hired by Darcy Partners, where she worked as an advisor for the consulting firm until 2019.

In September 2020, Cunningham became a director of Whiting Petroleum Corporation (now Chord Energy), where she also serves on the ESG and Audit Committees. She is also on the board of directors of Enbridge and Oil Search.

== Achievements and other work ==
=== Awards ===
Cunningham received the Rhodes Petroleum Industry Leadership Award in 2011, and was recognized as one of the Top 50 Most Powerful Women in Oil & Gas by the Oil & Gas Diversity Council in 2016. She has received numerous professional awards throughout her career, including the Top 25 Most Influential Women in Energy Award in 2019, the Offshore Technology Conference (OTC) Heritage Award in 2014, in addition to the WISE-BIO Houston Leadership in Technology Award.

=== Publications ===
Cunningham is one four contributors to the article "New Biostratigraphic Age Dates from the Lake Rukwa Rift Basin in Western Tanzania 1: Geologic Note," published in 1991. This publication addresses previous scientific conclusions with new findings concerning the three major stratigraphic units in the Rukwa Rift Basin. Through their drilling explorations Ms. Cunningham and her collaborators found that the data did not support the previously believed age dates.

While employed by Statoil, she co-authored a paper with Sigurd Heiberg titled "Managing E&P Opportunities, and Risks, Hidden by Uncertain Geologic Information," first presented at the 1998 Hedberg (AAPG) Research Conference in Galveston, Texas. The focus of this paper was how to create productive management through having a wealth of options to act and ensuring projects progress as planned. The article further touches on three defined steps in her approach, value of information, value of flexibility and value of sequencing decisions to gain both information and flexibility.

=== Philanthropy ===
In 2010, Cunningham gifted 1 million dollars to her alma mater, establishing the Susan Cunningham Research Chair in Geology at McMaster University. She returned to McMaster in November 2014 to deliver a lecture entitled ‘Leadership and the Oil Patch: How I Got There and What Is Needed’ which speaks to being a woman in the oil patch. The lecture was part of a series organized by McMaster's Academic Women's Success and Mentorship (AWSM).

=== Lectures ===
In May 2018, Cunningham spoke to her professional success alongside geologist William "Bill" Maloney at an event hosted by the Houston Geologic Society. Cunningham was also part of AAPG Distinguished Lecture Series' 2018–19 season, delivering a video lecture entitled "What it Takes to be Successful in Exploration." In 2019, she delivered a lecture on the theme "Agents of Change" at a TEDx event hosted by Trinity University in San Antonio, Texas.

== Public assets and net worth ==
MarketScreener evaluates Ms. Cunningham’s assets amount to a total of US$1,741,879. Ms Cunningham’s net worth, as of December 2016, was approximated at $8.48M USD.
