= EnCap Investments =

American private equity firm

- Company type: Limited partnership
- Industry: Private Equity
- Founded: 1988; 38 years ago
- Headquarters: Houston, Texas, United States
- Products: Investments, private equity funds
- AUM: $18 billion (2021)
- Number of employees: 50 (2021)
- Website: encapinvestments.com

EnCap Investments is an American private equity firm, specializing in the energy industry, particularly oil & gas. The firm was established in 1988 and is based in Houston, Texas.

== History ==
In 2012, the company started a $4.3 billion fund to invest in oil and gas. In 2013, EnCap was ranked at #16 Private Equity International's PEI 300 list, with some $11.8 billion under management. By 2022, it was ranked #54 with $12.1 billion capital raised over the past five years.

Since its founding, EnCap Investments has raised 18 private equity funds.

In February 2019, Kimbell Royalty Partners acquired certain oil and gas royalty assets from EnCap Investments for $151.3 million in a 100% equity transaction.

In February, 2021, Grayson Mill Energy, a company backed by EnCap Investments, acquired Equinor's oil and gas assets in the Bakken Formation in North Dakota for a reported $900 million. It was reported that Equinor held approximately 242,000 net acres in North Dakota at the time of the sale.

Later that year, the company raised $1.2 billion as part of its transition to clean energy investments, particularly wind and solar power.
