= Whiting Petroleum =

American Energy Production Company

Whiting Petroleum Corporation
- "Fundamentally better"
- Type: Public company
- Traded as: NYSE: WLL
- Industry: Petroleum industry
- Founded: 1980; 46 years ago
- Fate: Merged to form Chord Energy
- Headquarters: Denver, Colorado, U.S.
- Key people: Kevin S. McCarthy, Chairman; Lynn A. Peterson, CEO & President; James P. Henderson, CFO
- Products: Petroleum; Natural gas Natural gas liquids
- Production output: 91.9 thousand barrels of oil equivalent (562,000 GJ) per day (2021)
- Revenue: ▲$1.533 billion (2021)
- Operating income: 1,583,789,000 United States dollar (2022)
- Net income: ▲$427 million (2021)
- Total assets: ▲$2.457 billion (2021)
- Total equity: ▲$1.663 billion (2021)
- Number of employees: 356 (2022)

Whiting Petroleum Corporation was a company engaged in hydrocarbon exploration primarily in the Bakken Formation and Three Forks Shale. It was organized in Delaware with its operational headquarters in Denver, Colorado.

As of December 31, 2021, the company had approximately 326.0 million barrels of oil equivalent (1.994×10^{9} GJ) in proved reserves, of which 58% was petroleum, 20% was natural gas liquids, and 22% was natural gas.

The company ceased operations in 2022 after merging with Houston-based Oasis Petroleum to form Chord Energy Corporation.

== History ==
The company was founded in 1980 by Kenneth R. Whiting and Bert Ladd.

Alliant Energy, a Midwest public utility, acquired the company in 1992 for $27.5 million.

In 2003, the company became a public company via an initial public offering which raised over $400 million. In 2005, the company acquired assets in the North Ward Estes field for $459 million. The property was sold in 2016 for $300 million.

In July 2013, the company sold assets in the Oklahoma Panhandle to BreitBurn Energy Partners for $846 million. In August 2013, the company acquired assets in the Williston Basin for $260 million. In 2014, the company acquired Kodiak Oil & Gas. Kodiak had proven reserves of 167 million barrels of oil equivalent (1.02×10^{9} GJ) and Whiting effectively paid $23.77 per barrel in the ground.

In January 2017, the company sold midstream assets in North Dakota for $375 million. In August 2017, the company sold its assets near the Fort Berthold Indian Reservation in North Dakota for $500 million.

On April 1, 2020, the company filed for bankruptcy in the U.S. Bankruptcy Court for the Southern District of Texas. On September 1, 2020, the company emerged from bankruptcy and appointed Lynn A. Peterson as CEO.

In July 2022, Whiting Petroleum and Houston-based Oasis Petroleum completed a $6 million merger of equals.

== Environmental issues ==
In 2022, the company had a crude oil spill in marshland near Stanley, North Dakota. An EPA analysis in 2021 found that the Whiting company had over double the Emission intensity of other oil and gas companies in the United States.
