= Closing milestones of the Nasdaq Composite =

US stockmarket milestones

This article is a summary of the closing milestones of the Nasdaq Composite, a United States stock market index. Since first opening at 100.00 on February 5, 1971, the Nasdaq Composite has increased, despite several periods of decline.

== Milestone highs and lows ==
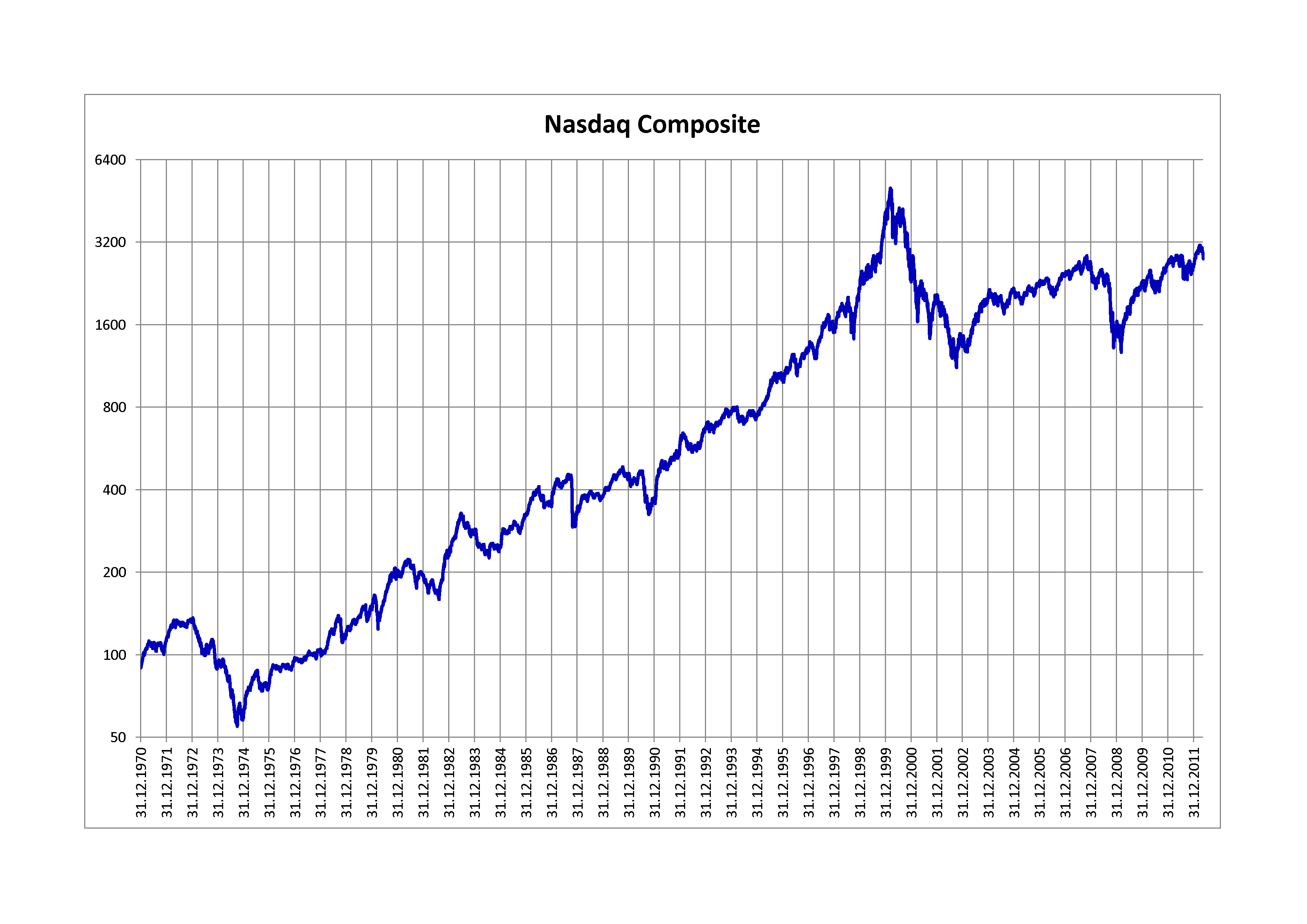
Nasdaq Composite 1970–2012

== Records ==
Category	All-Time Highs		All-Time Lows	
Closing	27,599.89	Tuesday, October 6, 2026	54.87	Thursday, October 3, 1974
Intraday	27,722.75	Tuesday, October 6, 2026	54.87	Thursday, October 3, 1974

== Incremental closing milestones ==
The following is a list of the milestone closing levels of the Nasdaq Composite. Threshold for milestones is as follows: 10-point increments are used up to the 500-point level; 20 to 1,000; 50 to 3,000; 100 to 10,000; 200 to 20,000; and 500-point increments thereafter. Bold formatting is applied to every five milestones, excluding peaks.

=== The Early 1970s Bull Market (1971–1972) ===
Milestone	Closing Level	Date First Achieved
100^{1}	100.00	February 5, 1971
110	110.16	April 19, 1971
120	120.47	February 2, 1972
130	130.00	April 5, 1972

=== The 1980s Bull Market (1978–1987) ===
Milestone	Closing Level	Date First Achieved
136.84^{2}	137.09	September 7, 1978
140	140.02	July 27, 1979
150	150.04	August 29, 1979
160	160.70	January 28, 1980
170	170.48	July 21, 1980
180	181.70	August 22, 1980
190	191.31	September 16, 1980
200	200.25	November 13, 1980
210	210.18	March 31, 1981
220	220.24	May 26, 1981
230	230.19	November 9, 1982
240	240.65	December 7, 1982
250	251.65	February 4, 1983
260	261.29	February 18, 1983
270	270.37	March 24, 1983
280	281.60	April 15, 1983
290	290.84	April 28, 1983
300	301.64	May 6, 1983
310	311.39	May 26, 1983
320	320.04	June 14, 1983
330	330.00	January 16, 1986
340	340.80	February 6, 1986
350	350.20	February 14, 1986
360	362.00	March 4, 1986
370	370.40	March 13, 1986
380	380.80	April 14, 1986
390	390.00	April 17, 1986
400	400.20	May 30, 1986
410	411.20	July 3, 1986
420	421.00	February 25, 1987
430	431.40	March 11, 1987
440	440.80	August 6, 1987
450	451.60	August 13, 1987

=== The 1990s Acceleration Bull Market (1989–2000) ===
Milestone	Closing Level	Date First Achieved
455.80^{3}	456.90	August 3, 1989
460	461.70	August 7, 1989
470	471.30	September 1, 1989
480	480.70	October 5, 1989
490	491.20	April 2, 1991
500	501.62	April 12, 1991
520	521.06	August 23, 1991
540	540.94	October 16, 1991
560	565.71	December 27, 1991
580	586.34	December 31, 1991
600	602.29	January 7, 1992
620	625.75	January 14, 1992
640	644.92	February 12, 1992
660	661.60	December 4, 1992
680	681.85	January 6, 1993
700	700.77	January 21, 1993
720	726.89	August 16, 1993
740	742.84	August 31, 1993
760	763.66	September 28, 1993
780	785.41	October 14, 1993
800	800.47	January 31, 1994
820	822.63	March 27, 1995
840	840.95	April 27, 1995
860	863.06	May 15, 1995
880	882.85	June 5, 1995
900	902.68	June 15, 1995
920	922.09	June 19, 1995
940	940.09	June 22, 1995
960	969.76	July 7, 1995
980	988.63	July 12, 1995
1,000	1,005.89	July 17, 1995
1,050	1,051.08	September 7, 1995
1,100	1,117.11	February 22, 1996
1,150	1,153.70	April 22, 1996
1,200	1,202.76	May 10, 1996
1,250	1,250.87	October 7, 1996
1,300	1,300.37	December 3, 1996
1,350	1,364.28	January 20, 1997
1,400	1,409.21	May 27, 1997
1,450	1,452.43	June 24, 1997
1,500	1,502.62	July 11, 1997
1,550	1,580.63	July 16, 1997
1,600	1,605.45	August 4, 1997
1,650	1,656.22	September 9, 1997
1,700	1,702.41	October 2, 1997
1,750	1,751.76	February 23, 1998
1,800	1,812.44	March 24, 1998
1,850	1,852.96	April 2, 1998
1,900	1,903.87	April 21, 1998
1,950	1,965.53	July 13, 1998
2,000	2,000.56	July 16, 1998
2,050	2,050.42	December 9, 1998
2,100	2,138.03	December 21, 1998
2,150	2,172.54	December 23, 1998
2,200	2,208.05	January 4, 1999
2,250	2,251.27	January 5, 1999
2,300	2,320.86	January 6, 1999
2,350	2,384.59	January 11, 1999
2,400	2,408.17	January 19, 1999
2,450	2,505.89	January 29, 1999
2,500	2,505.89	January 29, 1999
2,550	2,560.06	April 5, 1999
2,600	2,652.05	April 26, 1999
2,650	2,652.05	April 26, 1999
2,700	2,706.18	July 1, 1999
2,750	2,771.86	July 8, 1999
2,800	2,818.13	July 14, 1999
2,850	2,864.47	July 16, 1999
2,900	2,915.95	October 11, 1999
2,950	2,966.42	October 29, 1999
3,000	3,028.51	November 3, 1999
3,100	3,102.29	November 5, 1999
3,200	3,221.15	November 12, 1999
3,300	3,347.11	November 18, 1999
3,400	3,420.50	November 24, 1999
3,500	3,520.63	December 3, 1999
3,600	3,620.24	December 10, 1999
3,700	3,715.06	December 16, 1999
3,800	3,911.15	December 21, 1999
3,900	3,911.15	December 21, 1999
4,000	4,041.46	December 29, 1999
4,100	4,131.15	January 3, 2000
4,200	4,235.40	January 21, 2000
4,300	4,321.77	February 7, 2000
4,400	4,427.50	February 8, 2000
4,500	4,548.92	February 17, 2000
4,600	4,617.65	February 24, 2000
4,700	4,784.08	March 1, 2000
4,800	4,914.79	March 3, 2000
4,900	4,914.79	March 3, 2000
5,000	5,046.86	March 9, 2000

=== Do-Over of the Milestones (2002–2015) ===
Before the 2008 financial crisis (2002–2007)

After reaching an intra-day low of 1,108.49 on October 10, 2002, after the bursting of the dot-com bubble, the Nasdaq started to recover until a major setback during the 2008 financial crisis.

Milestone	Closing Level	Date Achieved Again
1,150	1,163.37	October 10, 2002
1,200	1,210.47	October 11, 2002
1,250	1,282.44	October 15, 2002
1,300	1,309.67	October 21, 2002
1,350	1,360.70	November 1, 2002
1,400	1,401.17	November 5, 2002
1,450	1,467.55	November 21, 2002
1,500	1,502.88	May 2, 2003
1,550	1,551.38	May 15, 2003
1,600	1,603.56	June 3, 2003
1,650	1,653.62	June 12, 2003
1,700	1,720.71	July 7, 2003
1,750	1,754.82	July 14, 2003
1,800	1,800.18	August 28, 2003
1,850	1,852.90	September 3, 2003
1,900	1,909.55	September 18, 2003
1,950	1,950.14	October 16, 2003
2,000	2,006.48	December 29, 2003
2,050	2 057.37	January 6, 2004
2,100	2,100.25	January 8, 2004
2,150	2,153.83	January 26, 2004
2,200	2,218.15	August 2, 2005
2,250	2,253.56	November 22, 2005
2,300	2,305.62	January 6, 2006
2,350	2,359.75	April 5, 2006
2,400	2,406.38	November 13, 2006
2,450	2,452.72	November 20, 2006
2,500	2,502.82	January 12, 2007
2,550	2,554.45	April 26, 2007
2,600	2,604.52	May 31, 2007
2,650	2,656.65	July 5, 2007
2,700	2,701.73	July 12, 2007
2,750	2,780.32	October 5, 2007
2,800	2,803.91	October 9, 2007
2,850	2,859.12	October 31, 2007

After the 2008 financial crisis (2011–2015)

After the 2008 financial crisis, Nasdaq started another recovery that ultimately led to the all-time closing high setback in 2000.

Milestone	Closing Level	Date Achieved Again
2,859.12^{5}	2,869.88	April 27, 2011
2,900	2,905.66	February 3, 2012
2,950	2,959.85	February 16, 2012
3,000	3,039.88	March 13, 2012
3,100	3,122.57	March 26, 2012
3,200	3,213.59	February 19, 2013
3,300	3,300.16	April 11, 2013
3,400	3,420.50	May 8, 2013
3,500	3,502.12	May 21, 2013
3,600	3,600.08	July 12, 2013
3,700	3,706.18	September 9, 2013
3,800	3,817.98	October 1, 2013
3,900	3,914.28	October 18, 2013
4,000	4,017.75	November 26, 2013
4,100	4,104.74	December 20, 2013
4,200	4,214.88	January 15, 2014
4,300	4,318.93	February 27, 2014
4,400	4,408.18	June 30, 2014
4,500	4,508.31	August 18, 2014
4,600	4,630.74	October 31, 2014
4,700	4,702.44	November 18, 2014
4,800	4,806.86	December 26, 2014
4,900	4,906.36	February 18, 2015
5,000	5,008.10	March 2, 2015

=== The 2010s Cyclical Bull Market (2015–2020) ===
Milestone	Closing Level	Date First Achieved
5,048.62^{4}	5,056.06	April 23, 2015
5,100^{6}	5,106.59	May 27, 2015
5,132.52^{7}	5,132.95	June 18, 2015
5,200	5,210.14	July 17, 2015
5,218.86^{8}	5,221.12	August 5, 2016
5,300	5,339.52	September 22, 2016
5,400^{9}	5,417.36	December 8, 2016
5,500^{10}	5,521.06	January 6, 2017
5,600	5,600.96	January 24, 2017
5,700	5,715.18	February 9, 2017
5,800	5,819.44	February 15, 2017
5,900	5,904.03	March 1, 2017
6,000^{11}	6,025.49	April 25, 2017
6,100	6,100.76	May 5, 2017
6,200	6,205.26	May 25, 2017
6,300	6,305.80	June 2, 2017
6,400	6,410.81	July 24, 2017
6,500	6,516.72	October 2, 2017
6,600	6,603.55	October 11, 2017
6,700	6,701.26	October 27, 2017
6,800	6,862.48	November 21, 2017
6,900	6,912.36	November 28, 2017
7,000^{12}	7,006.90	January 2, 2018
7,100	7,136.56	January 5, 2018
7,200	7,211.78	January 11, 2018
7,300^{13}	7,336.38	January 19, 2018
7,400	7,408.03	January 22, 2018
7,500	7,505.77	January 26, 2018
7,600^{14}	7,606.46	June 4, 2018
7,700	7,703.79	June 12, 2018
7,800^{15}	7,823.92	July 12, 2018
7,900	7,932.24	July 25, 2018
8,000	8,017.90	August 27, 2018
8,100	8,109.69	August 29, 2018
8,200	8,202.53	July 10, 2019
8,300	8,321.50	July 24, 2019
8,400	8,433.20	November 4, 2019
8,500	8,540.83	November 15, 2019
8,600	8,632.49	November 25, 2019
8,700	8,705.18	November 27, 2019
8,800	8,814.23	December 16, 2019
8,900	8,924.96	December 20, 2019
9,000	9,022.39	December 26, 2019
9,100	9,129.24	January 8, 2020
9,200	9,203.43	January 9, 2020
9,300	9,357.13	January 16, 2020
9,400	9,402.48	January 23, 2020
9,500	9,508.68	February 5, 2020
9,600	9,628.39	February 10, 2020
9,700	9,725.96	February 12, 2020
9,800	9,817.18	February 19, 2020

=== Bull Recession of 2020 ===
Milestone	Closing Level	Date First Achieved
9,817.18^{16}	9,924.75	June 8, 2020
9,900	9,924.75	June 8, 2020
10,000	10,020.35	June 10, 2020
10,200	10,207.63	July 2, 2020
10,400	10,433.65	July 6, 2020
10,600	10,617.44	July 10, 2020
10,800	10,902.80	August 3, 2020
11,000	11,108.07	August 6, 2020
11,200	11,210.84	August 18, 2020
11,400	11,466.47	August 25, 2020
11,600	11,665.06	August 26, 2020
11,800	11,939.67	September 1, 2020
12,000	12,056.44	September 2, 2020
12,200	12,205.85	November 27, 2020
12,400	12,464.23	December 4, 2020
12,600	12,658.19	December 16, 2020
12,800	12,807.92	December 22, 2020
13,000	13,067.48	January 7, 2021
13,200	13,201.97	January 8, 2021
13,400	13,457.25	January 20, 2021
13,600	13,635.99	January 25, 2021
13,800	13,856.30	February 5, 2021
14,000	14,007.70	February 9, 2021
14,200	14,253.27	June 22, 2021
14,400	14,500.51	June 28, 2021
14,600	14,639.33	July 2, 2021
14,800	14,836.99	July 23, 2021
15,000	15,019.80	August 24, 2021
15,200	15,265.89	August 30, 2021
15,400	15,448.12	October 28, 2021
15,600	15,649.60	November 2, 2021
15,800	15,811.58	November 3, 2021
16,000	16,057.44	November 19, 2021
16,200	16,274.94	March 1, 2024
16,400	16,401.84	March 21, 2024
16,600	16,742.39	May 15, 2024
16,800	16,832.62	May 21, 2024
17,000	17,019.88	May 28, 2024
17,200	17,343.55	June 11, 2024
17,400	17,608.44	June 12, 2024
17,600	17,608.44	June 12, 2024
17,800	17,857.02	June 17, 2024
18,000	18,028.76	July 2, 2024
18,200	18,352.76	July 5, 2024
18,400	18,403.74	July 8, 2024
18,600	18,647.45	July 10, 2024
18,800	18,983.47	November 6, 2024
19,000	19,269.46	November 7, 2024
19,200	19,269.46	November 7, 2024
19,400	19,403.95	December 2, 2024
19,600	19,735.12	December 4, 2024
19,800	19,859.77	December 6, 2024
20,000	20,034.89	December 11, 2024
20,500	20,601.10	July 3, 2025
21,000	21,020.02	July 23, 2025
21,500	21,681.90	August 12, 2025
22,000	22,043.07	September 11, 2025
22,500	22,631.48	September 19, 2025
23,000	23,043.38	October 8, 2025
23,500	23,637.46	October 27, 2025
24,000	24,016.02	April 15, 2026
24,500	24,657.57	April 22, 2026
25,000	25,114.44	May 1, 2026
25,500	25,838.94	May 6, 2026
26,000	26,247.08	May 8, 2026
26,500	26,635.22	May 14, 2026
27,000	27,086.81	June 1, 2026
27,500	27,599.89	October 6, 2026

== List of 1000-point milestones by number of trading days ==
Milestone (closing)	Date of Record	Trading Days
1,000	July 17, 1995	6,176
2,000	July 16, 1998	758
3,000	November 3, 1999	329
4,000	December 29, 1999	38
5,000	March 9, 2000	49
6,000	April 25, 2017	4,310
7,000	January 2, 2018	174
8,000	August 27, 2018	164
9,000	December 26, 2019	335
10,000	June 10, 2020	114
11,000	August 6, 2020	40
12,000	September 2, 2020	19
13,000	January 7, 2021	87
14,000	February 9, 2021	22
15,000	August 24, 2021	136
16,000	November 19, 2021	62
17,000	May 28, 2024	631
18,000	July 2, 2024	24
19,000	November 7, 2024	90
20,000	December 11, 2024	23
21,000	July 23, 2025	151
22,000	September 11, 2025	35
23,000	October 8, 2025	19
24,000	April 15, 2026	129
25,000	May 1, 2026	12
26,000	May 8, 2026	5
27,000	June 1, 2026	15

== List of 10,000-point milestones by number of trading days ==
Milestone	Date of Record	Trading Days
10,000	June 10, 2020	12,447
20,000	December 11, 2024	1,134

== See also ==
- Closing milestones of the Dow Jones Industrial Average
- Closing milestones of the S&P 500
- List of largest daily changes in the Nasdaq Composite
- Market trend
- Stock market bubble
- Stock market crash

== Notes ==
^{1}This was the Nasdaq's very first close on February 5, 1971.
^{2}This was the Nasdaq's close at the peak on January 11, 1973.
^{3}This was the Nasdaq's close at the peak on August 27, 1987.
^{4}This was the Nasdaq's close at the peak on March 10, 2000.
^{5}This was the Nasdaq's close at the peak on October 31, 2007.
^{6}The Nasdaq first traded above 5,100 on March 10, 2000; however, it took over 15 years for the Nasdaq to finally close above 5,100.
^{7}This was the Nasdaq's all-time intraday high on March 10, 2000, which was finally broken on June 18, 2015.
^{8}This was the Nasdaq's close at the peak on July 20, 2015, before the 2015-16 stock market selloff.
^{9}The Nasdaq first traded above 5,400 during the session on Tuesday, November 29, 2016, but dropped below before the closing. Over the next few days, Nasdaq returned its post-election gains; however, the Nasdaq finally closed above 5,400 on Thursday, December 8, 2016.
^{10}The Nasdaq first exceeded 5,500 intraday on Tuesday, December 27, 2016, before falling back below before closing and then retreated for the next two days, throwing away some of its recent gains. However, it took until January 6 of next year when the Nasdaq finally closed above 5,500.
^{11}Since first reaching 5,000 on March 7, 2000, the Nasdaq slowly crawled its way towards 6,000 with major setbacks over the course of 17 years before finally trading above 6,000 (intraday and closing) on April 25, 2017.
^{12}The Nasdaq first hit 7,000 during the trading session on Monday, December 18, 2017, before falling back underneath the millenary milestone at closing time and then flirted with it the next day before retreating. January 2, 2018 the first trading day of 2018 was when the Nasdaq first closed above 7,000.
^{13}Although the Nasdaq first reached 7,300 intraday on Tuesday, January 16, 2018, the COMP has flirted with the milestone all week and then closed above it three days later.
^{14}The Nasdaq first reached 7,600 on Monday, March 12, 2018, before falling back below it for the close. This was repeated the next trading day before another major pullback for the year. It took until Monday, June 4, 2018 (nearly three months) for the Nasdaq to finally close above 7,600.
^{15}The Nasdaq first topped 7,800 on Wednesday, June 20, 2018, before falling back underneath at closing time before another pullback took place. It took until July 12, 2018, to finally close above this milestone.
^{16}After peaking on February 19, 2020, the Nasdaq Composite rapidly fell into correction later that same month and into bear market territory in the next month amid the COVID-19 pandemic.
