= Closing milestones of the Dow Jones Industrial Average =

Historical milestones of the Dow Jones Industrial Average

This article is a summary of the closing milestones of the Dow Jones Industrial Average, a United States stock market index. It first closed at 62.76 on February 16, 1885.

== Price history ==
=== Early years ===
When it was first published in the mid-1880s, the index stood at a level of 62.76. It reached a peak of 78.38 during the summer of 1890, but reached its all-time low of 28.48 in the summer of 1896 during the Panic of 1896. Many of the biggest percentage price moves in the Dow occurred early in its history, as the nascent industrial economy matured. In the 1900s, the Dow halted its momentum as it worked its way through two financial crises: the Panic of 1901 and the Panic of 1907. The Dow remained stuck in a range between 53 and 103 until late 1914. The negativity surrounding the 1906 San Francisco earthquake did little to improve the economic climate; the index broke 100 for the first time in 1906.

At the start of the 1910s, the Panic of 1910–1911 stifled economic growth. On July 30, 1914, as the average stood at a level of 71.42, a decision was made to close the New York Stock Exchange, and suspend trading for a span of four and a half months. Some historians believe the exchange was closed because of a concern that markets would plunge as a result of panic over the onset of World War I. An alternative explanation is that the United States Secretary of the Treasury, William Gibbs McAdoo, closed the exchange to conserve the U.S. gold stock in order to launch the Federal Reserve System later that year, with enough gold to keep the United States on par with the gold standard. When the markets reopened on December 12, 1914, the index closed at 74.56, a gain of 4.4%. This is frequently reported as a large drop, due to using a later redefinition. Reports from the time say that the day was positive. Following World War I, the United States experienced another economic downturn, the Post–World War I recession. The Dow's performance remained unchanged from the closing value of the previous decade, adding only 8.26%, from 99.05 at the beginning of 1910, to a level of 107.23 at the end of 1919.

The Dow experienced a long bull run from 1920 to late 1929 when it rose from 73 to 381 points. In 1928, the components of the Dow were increased to 30 stocks near the economic height of that decade, which was nicknamed the Roaring Twenties. This period downplayed the influence of the Depression of 1920–1921 and certain international conflicts such as the Polish–Soviet War, the Irish Civil War, the Turkish War of Independence and the initial phase of the Chinese Civil War. After a peak of 381.17 on September 3, 1929, the bottom of the 1929 crash came just 2 months later on November 13, 1929, at 195.35 intraday, closing slightly higher at 198.69. The Wall Street Crash of 1929 and the ensuing Great Depression over the next several years saw the Dow continue to fall until July 8, 1932, when it closed at 41.22, roughly two-thirds of its mid-1880s starting point and almost 90% below its peak. Overall for the 1920s decade, the Dow still ended with a healthy 131.7% gain, from 107.23 to 248.48 at the end of 1929. In inflation-adjusted numbers, the high of 381.17 on September 3, 1929, was not surpassed until 1954.

Marked by global instability and the Great Depression, the 1930s contended with several consequential European and Asian outbreaks of war, leading to the catastrophic World War II in 1939. Other conflicts during the decade which affected the stock market included the 1936–1939 Spanish Civil War, the 1935–1936 Second Italo-Abyssinian War, the Soviet-Japanese Border War of 1939, and the Second Sino-Japanese War of 1937. The United States experienced the Recession of 1937–1938, which temporarily brought economic recovery to a halt. The largest one-day percentage gain in the index happened in the depths of the 1930s bear market on March 15, 1933, when the Dow gained 15.34% to close at 62.10. However, as a whole throughout the Great Depression, the Dow posted some of its worst performances, for a negative return during most of the 1930s for new and old stock market investors. For the decade, the Dow Jones average was down from 248.48 at the beginning of 1930, to a stable level of 150.24 at the end of 1939, a loss of about 40%.

=== 1940s ===
Post-war reconstruction during the 1940s, along with renewed optimism of peace and prosperity, brought about a 33% surge in the Dow from 150.24 to 200.13. The strength in the Dow occurred despite the Recession of 1949 and various global conflicts.

=== 1950s ===
During the 1950s, the Korean War and the Cold War did not stop the Dow's climb higher. A nearly 240% increase in the average from 200.13 to 679.36 ensued over the course of that decade.

=== 1960s ===
The Dow began to stall during the 1960s as the markets trudged through the Kennedy Slide of 1962, but still managed an 18% gain from 679.36 to 800.36.

=== 1970s ===
The 1970s marked a time of economic uncertainty and troubled relations between the U.S. and certain Middle-Eastern countries. The 1970s energy crisis was a prelude to a disastrous economic climate along with stagflation, the combination of high unemployment and high inflation. However, on November 14, 1972, the average closed at 1,003.16, above 1,000 for the first time, during a brief relief rally in the midst of a lengthy bear market. Between January 1973 and December 1974, the DJIA lost 48% of its value in the 1973–1974 stock market crash, closing at 577.60 on December 6, 1974. The nadir came after prices dropped more than 45% over two years since the NYSE's high point of 1,003.16 on November 4, 1972. In 1976, the index reached 1,000 several times and it closed the year at 1,004.75. Although the Vietnam War ended in 1975, new tensions arose towards Iran surrounding the Iranian Revolution in 1979. Performance-wise for the 1970s, the index remained virtually flat, rising 4.8% from 800.36 to 838.74.

=== 1980s ===
The Dow fell 22.61% on Black Monday (1987) from about the 2,500 level to around 1,750. Two days later, it rose 10.15% above the 2,000 level for a mild recovery attempt.

The 1980s began with the early 1980s recession. In early 1981, the index broke above 1,000 several times, but then retreated. After closing above 2,000 in January 1987, the largest one-day percentage drop occurred on Black Monday, October 19, 1987, when the average fell 22.61%. There were no clear reasons given to explain the crash.

On October 13, 1989, the Friday the 13th mini-crash, which initiated the collapse of the junk bond market, resulted in a loss of almost 7% of the index in a single day.

During the 1980s, the Dow increased 228% from 838.74 to 2,753.20; despite the market crashes, Silver Thursday, an early 1980s recession, the 1980s oil glut, the Japanese asset price bubble, and other political distractions. The index had only two negative years in the 1980s: in 1981 and 1984.

=== 1990s ===
The 1990s brought on rapid advances in technology along with the introduction of the dot-com era. The markets contended with the 1990 oil price shock compounded with the effects of the early 1990s recession and a brief European situation surrounding Black Wednesday. Certain influential foreign conflicts such as the 1991 Soviet coup d'état attempt which took place as part of the initial stages of the Dissolution of the Soviet Union and the Revolutions of 1989; the First Chechen War and the Second Chechen War, the Gulf War, and the Yugoslav Wars failed to dampen economic enthusiasm surrounding the ongoing Information Age and the "irrational exuberance" (a phrase coined by Alan Greenspan) of the dot-com bubble. Between late 1992 and early 1993, the Dow staggered through the 3,000 level making only modest gains as the biotechnology sector suffered through the downfall of the Biotech Bubble; as many biotech companies saw their share prices rapidly rise to record levels and then subsequently fall to new all-time lows.

The DJIA reached 8,000 in July 1997.

In October 1997, the events surrounding the 1997 Asian financial crisis plunged the Dow into a 554-point loss to a close of 7,161.15; a retrenchment of 7.18% in what became known as the October 27, 1997, mini-crash.

In April 1998, the DJIA broke above 9,000 despite negativity surrounding the 1998 Russian financial crisis along with the subsequent fallout from the 1998 collapse of Long-Term Capital Management due to bad bets placed on the movement of the Russian ruble.

On March 29, 1999, the average closed at 10,006.78, its first close above 10,000. This prompted a celebration on the New York Stock Exchange trading floor, complete with party hats.

Total gains for the decade exceeded 315%; from 2,753.20 to 11,497.12, which equates to 12.3% annually.

The Dow averaged a 5.3% return compounded annually for the 20th century, a record Warren Buffett called "a wonderful century"; when he calculated that to achieve that return again, the index would need to close at about 2,000,000 by December 2099.

=== 2000s ===
The Dow fell 14.3% after the September 11 attacks. Exchanges were closed from September 12 through September 16, 2001.

On September 17, 2001, the first day of trading after the September 11 attacks on the United States, the Dow fell 7.1%. However, the Dow began an upward trend shortly after the attacks, and regained all lost ground to close above 10,000 for the year. In 2002, the Dow dropped to a four-year low of 7,286 on September 24, 2002, due to the stock market downturn of 2002 and lingering effects of the dot-com bubble. Overall, while the NASDAQ index fell roughly 75% and the S&P 500 index fell roughly 50% between 2000 and 2002, the Dow only fell 27% during the same period. In 2003, the Dow held steady within the 7,000 to 9,000-point level and recovered to the 10,000 mark by year end.

The Dow continued climbing and reached a record high of 14,198.10 on October 11, 2007, a mark which was not matched until March 2013. It then dropped over the next year due to the 2008 financial crisis.

On September 15, 2008, a wider financial crisis became evident after the Bankruptcy of Lehman Brothers along with the economic effect of record high oil prices which had reached almost $150 per barrel two months earlier. The Dow lost more than 500 points for the day, returning to its mid-July lows below 11,000. A series of bailout packages, including the Emergency Economic Stabilization Act of 2008, proposed and implemented by the Federal Reserve and United States Department of the Treasury did not prevent further losses. After nearly six months of extreme volatility during which the Dow experienced its largest one-day point loss, largest daily point gain, and largest intraday range (of more than 1,000 points) at the time, the index closed at a new 12-year low of 6,547.05 on March 9, 2009, its lowest close since April 1997. The Dow had lost 20% of its value in only six weeks.

Towards the latter half of 2009, the average rallied towards the 10,000 level amid optimism that the Great Recession, the United States housing bubble and the 2008 financial crisis, were easing and possibly coming to an end. For the decade, the Dow saw a rather substantial pullback for a negative return from 11,497.12 to 10,428.05, a loss of a 9.3%.

=== 2010s ===
The Dow from January 2000 through February 2015

During the first half of the 2010s decade, aided by the Federal Reserve's loose monetary policy including quantitative easing, the Dow made a notable rally attempt. This was despite significant volatility due to growing global concerns such as the European debt crisis, the Dubai World 2009 debt standstill, and the 2011 United States debt-ceiling crisis.

On May 6, 2010, the Dow lost 9.2% intra-day and regained nearly all of it within a single hour. This event, which became known as the 2010 Flash Crash, sparked new regulations to prevent future incidents.

Six years after its previous high in 2007, the Dow finally closed at a new record high on March 5, 2013.

It continued rising for the next several years past 17,000 points until a brief 2015–2016 stock market selloff in the second half of 2015.

It climbed past 25,000 points on January 4, 2018.

On November 9, 2016, the day after Donald Trump's victory over Hillary Clinton in the U.S. presidential election, the index soared, coming within roughly 25 points of its all-time intraday high to that point.

Volatility returned in 2018 when the Dow fell nearly 20%. By early January 2019, the index had quickly rallied more than 10% from its Christmas Eve low.

Overall in the 2010s decade, the Dow increased from 10,428.05 to 28,538.44 for a substantial gain of 174%.

=== 2020s ===
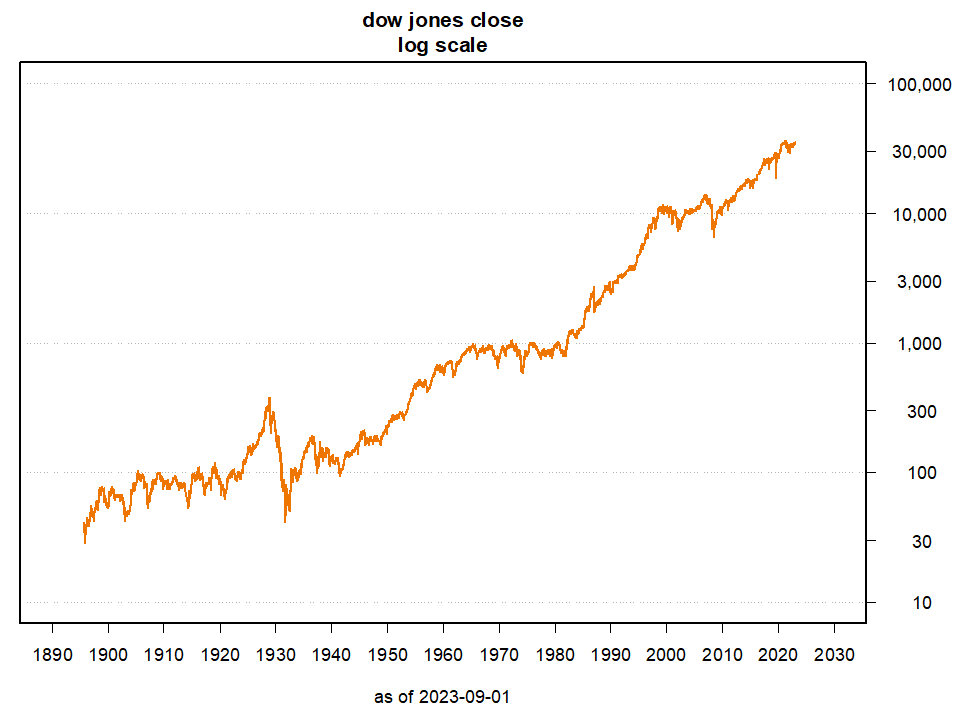
The Dow Jones Industrial Average daily closing value plotted on a log-10 scale

Despite the emerging COVID-19 pandemic, the Dow continued its bull run from the previous decade before peaking at 29,551.42 on February 12, 2020 (29,568.57 intraday on the same day). The index slowly retreated for the remainder of the week and into the next week, before coronavirus fears and an oil price war between Saudi Arabia and Russia sent the index into a tailspin, recording several days of losses (and gains) of at least 1,000 points, a typical symptom of a bear market as previously seen in October 2008 during the 2008 financial crisis. Volatility rose high enough to trigger multiple 15-minute trading halts. In the first quarter of 2020, the DJIA fell 23%, its worst quarter since 1987. The market recovered in the third quarter, returning to 28,837.52 on October 12, 2020, and peaked momentarily at a new all-time high of 29,675.25 on November 9, 2020, at 14:00 ET, following that day's announcement of the success of the Pfizer–BioNTech COVID-19 vaccine in Phase III clinical trials. On November 24, following news that the presidential transition of Joe Biden was approved, the Dow increased by more than 500 points, closing at 30,046.24. The Dow (as reported by the United Press International) closed on December 31, 2020, at a record 30,606.48.

On January 22, 2024, the Dow Jones crossed 38,000 points for the first time; a month later it surpassed 39,000; and in May, it surpassed 40,000 points. On February 6, 2026, the index crossed 50,000 for the first time.

== Milestone highs and lows ==
Like most other stock market indices, the Dow undergoes periods of general increase and general declines or stagnation. A bull market is a term denoting a period of price increases, while a bear market denotes a period of declines. A bear market is when multiple broad market indices have a downturn of 20% or more in value lasting for at least two months.

There are two types of bull markets. A secular bull market is a period in which the stock market index is continually reaching all-time highs with only brief periods of correction, as during the 1990s, and can last upwards of 15 years. A cyclical bull market is a period in which the stock market index is reaching 52-week or multi-year highs and may briefly peak at all-time highs before a rapid decline, as in the early 1970s. It usually occurs within relatively longer bear markets and lasts about three years.

The following are the secular bull and bear markets experienced by the Dow since its inception:

- 1885–1890: Bull market. From its first close of 62.76 on February 16, 1885, the Dow rose steadily for five years, until reaching a peak of 78.38 on June 4, 1890. This record stood for nearly 15 years, until the Dow closed at 79.27 on March 24, 1905.
- 1890–1896: Bear market. The Dow plunged over 63% over the next six years, to set an all-time low of 28.48, on August 8, 1896.
- 1896–1906: Bull market. After setting an all-time low during the summer of 1896, the Dow quickly erased these losses, and reached a peak of 103.00 on January 19, 1906.
- 1906–1915: Bear market. The Dow lost 48.5% of its value over the next 22 months, before reaching a low of 53.00 on November 15, 1907. From 1906 to 1915, the Dow remained stuck trading between 53 and 103. The index reached a secondary low of 53.17 on December 24, 1914.
- 1915–1919: Bull market. After hitting a seven-year low in late 1914, the Dow rose 125% over the next five years, reaching a new high of 119.62 on November 3, 1919.
- 1919–1921: Bear market. The Dow lost 46.6% of its value in just over 21 months, before reaching a low of 63.90 on August 24, 1921.
- 1921–1929: Bull market. Over the next eight years, the Dow increased nearly 500%, and eventually grows to a closing high of 381.17 on September 3, 1929.
- 1929–1949: Bear market. The Wall Street Crash 1929, or Black Tuesday, led to the Great Depression. The Dow plunged 89% to 41.22 on July 8, 1932, thus erasing 33 years of gains, in just under three years. Although cyclical bull markets occurred in the 1930s and 1940s, the index took 22 years to surpass its previous highs.
- 1949–1966: Bull market. The Dow posted impressive growth in the booming economy following the Second World War. Starting from 161.60 in June 1949, when P/E ratios reached multi-decade lows, the index ended just five points below 1,000 on February 9, 1966. The inflation-adjusted high set on December 31, 1965 was not surpassed for nearly 30 years, until the Dow's first close above 4,700 on July 7, 1995.
- 1966–1982: Bear market. Traders dealt with a stagnant economy in an inflationary monetary environment. The Dow entered two long downturns in 1970 and 1974; during the latter, it fell 45% to the bottom of a 20-year range. Three short-lived cyclical bull markets occurred during this period, each of which lasted no more than two years.
- 1982–2000: Bull market. The Dow experienced its most spectacular rise in history. From a meager 776.92 on August 12, 1982, the index rose 1,409% to close at 11,722.98 by January 14, 2000, without any major reversals except for the brief but severe Black Monday (1987), which included the largest daily percentage loss in Dow history.
- 2000–2003: Bear market. The index meandered, and then plunged 30% in the stock market downturn of 2002, to a closing low of 7,286.27 on October 9, 2002.
- 2003–2007: Bull market. A cyclical bull closing peak of 14,164.53, reached exactly five years later, did not surpass the inflation-adjusted high set on December 31, 1999.
- 2007–2009: Bear market. A renewed bear was recognized in summer 2008 and multiple volatility records are set that autumn. Such volatility did not return until 2020, when the Dow recorded several trading days with point swings of at least 1,000 points, alternating between losses and gains like in fall 2008. Another acute phase in early 2009 bought the index to a new 12 1/2 year closing low of 6,547.05, on March 9, 2009, for a total loss of 54% in 17 months.
- 2009–2020: Bull market. The Dow remained volatile during its ensuing climb, losing almost 20% during the summers of 2010 and 2011, however, by February 1, 2013, the index finally closed above 14,000 for the first time since October 2007. The Dow continued upward to surpass its prior all-time record on March 5, 2013, and, by the end of 2013, sets a new all-time inflation-adjusted high for the first time since the end of 1999. For the remainder of the decade, Dow Jones, NASDAQ, and S&P 500 faced some corrections that nearly ended the bull run, but ultimately towered above several millenary milestones by the end of 2019. The COVID-19 pandemic, along with the oil-price war between Russia and Saudi Arabia, ended the long bull market.
- March–November 2020: Bear market. The long bull run came to an end during the COVID-19 pandemic. Ending after just 8 months, this was the shortest bear market in 30 years.
- 2020–2021: Bull market. After a quick recovery from the first bear market in over a decade, the Dow rallied near 37,000.
- 2022–2023: Bear market. This bull market broke in early 2022, during the 2022 stock market decline amid fears of inflation, widely attributed to financial stimulus packages designed to stabilize the economy following COVID-19 recession as the relief without corresponding increase in supply contributed to the 2021–2022 inflation surge. Supply shocks were exacerbated by pandemic-era shutdowns and restrictions) together with the 2021–2023 global supply chain crisis.
- 2024–Present: Bull market. Central bank monetary policy achieved a so-called "soft landing", successfully avoiding high inflation akin to the late 1960s but also while avoiding a recession amid a backdrop of healthy corporate and consumer balance sheets. The market quickly rallied past 45,000, fueled further by tech speculation amid early consumer excitement around LLMs and significant tax incentives and retail investor interest for capital expenditures to advance the technology. On February 6, 2026, the Dow surpassed 50,000 for the first time.

== Records ==
As indicated above, an all-time low was 28.48, on August 8, 1896.

Category	All-time highs		All-time lows	
Closing	54,349.12	Wednesday, August 5, 2026	41.22	Friday, July 8, 1932
Intraday	54,744.33	Wednesday, August 5, 2026	40.56	Friday, July 8, 1932

== Incremental closing milestones ==
The following is a list of the milestone closing levels of the Dow Jones Industrial Average.

Legend:

- 1-point increments are used up to the 20-point level,
- 2-point increments up to the 50-point level,
- 5-point increments up to the 100-point level,
- 10-point increments up to the 500-point level,
- 20-point increments up to the 1,000-point level,
- 50-point increments up to the 3,000-point level,
- 100-point increments up to the 10,000-point level,
- 200-point increments up to the 20,000-point level,
- 500-point increments up to the 50,000-point level, and
- 1,000-point increments thereafter.

Bold formatting is applied every 5 milestones.

=== The Late 19th Century Bull Market (1885–1890) ===
Milestone	Closing level	Date first achieved
62.76^{1}	62.76	February 16, 1885
65		February 18, 1888
70		
75		

=== The Century Turnover Bull Market (1896–1906) ===
Milestone	Closing level	Date first achieved
78.38^{2}	79.27	March 24, 1905
80	80.02	March 31, 1905
85	85.22	November 20, 1905
90	90.82	December 5, 1905
95	95.13	December 12, 1905
100	100.25	January 12, 1906

=== The 1910s Bull Market (1916) ===
Milestone	Closing level	Date first achieved
103.00^{3}	103.11	September 28, 1916
110	110.13	November 18, 1916

=== The 1920s Bull Market (1924–1929) ===
Milestone	Closing level	Date first achieved
119.62^{4}	120.51	December 31, 1924
120	120.51	December 31, 1924
130	130.42	June 2, 1925
140	140.20	August 15, 1925
150	150.29	October 20, 1925
160	160.53	February 4, 1926
170	170.29	May 19, 1927
180	180.09	July 27, 1927
190	190.00	August 29, 1927
200	200.93	December 19, 1927
210	210.36	March 26, 1928
220	220.09	May 8, 1928
230	233.68	August 24, 1928
240	240.41	August 31, 1928
250	250.87	October 17, 1928
260	260.68	November 7, 1928
270	276.66	November 16, 1928
280	283.90	November 20, 1928
290	290.34	November 22, 1928
300	300.00	December 31, 1928
310	310.33	January 23, 1929
320	322.06	February 5, 1929
330	331.65	June 28, 1929
340	340.28	July 2, 1929
350	350.56	August 1, 1929
360	361.49	August 16, 1929
370	374.61	August 23, 1929
380	380.33	August 30, 1929

=== Great Depression/World War II (1929–1954) ===
==== During the Great Depression (1929–1937) ====
After reaching an intra-day low of 40.56 on July 8, 1932, the Dow started to recover with a major setback at the start of World War II.

Milestone	Closing level	Date achieved again
40	41.22	July 8, 1932
42	42.99	July 11, 1932
44	44.88	July 13, 1932
46	46.50	July 21, 1932
48	49.78	July 25, 1932
50	51.34	July 27, 1932
55	58.22	August 3, 1932
60	62.60	August 5, 1932
65	66.56	August 6, 1932
70	70.87	August 22, 1932
75	75.61	August 27, 1932
80	80.78	May 10, 1933
85	86.42	May 26, 1933
90	90.02	May 29, 1933
95	96.75	June 12, 1933
100	100.92	July 1, 1933
110	110.74	February 5, 1934
120	120.75	June 22, 1935
130	130.75	September 6, 1935
140	140.68	October 25, 1935
150	150.62	February 3, 1936
160	160.43	April 2, 1936
170	170.76	October 2, 1936
180	180.66	November 4, 1936
190	190.29	February 11, 1937

==== The Post-World War II Years (1945–1954) ====
After the end of the second World War, the Dow started another recovery that ultimately led to the all-time closing high set back in 1929.

Milestone	Closing level	Date achieved again
194.40^{6}	195.18	December 8, 1945
200	200.04	January 11, 1946
210	211.70	May 28, 1946
220	220.60	May 17, 1950
230	231.15	October 4, 1950
240	240.86	January 4, 1951
250	250.76	February 1, 1951
260	260.71	May 1, 1951
270	270.25	August 31, 1951
280	280.29	August 11, 1952
290	292.00	December 30, 1952
300	300.83	March 11, 1954
310	311.76	April 14, 1954
320	320.41	May 6, 1954
330	330.72	June 23, 1954
340	341.12	July 6, 1954
350	350.38	August 20, 1954
360	361.67	September 24, 1954
370	371.07	November 9, 1954

=== The Post-World War II Boom Market (1954–1966) ===
Milestone	Closing level	Date first achieved
380	382.74	November 23, 1954
381.17^{5}	382.74	November 23, 1954
390	392.48	December 6, 1954
400	401.97	December 29, 1954
410	410.32	February 9, 1955
420	420.94	April 12, 1955
430	430.64	April 26, 1955
440	440.17	June 13, 1955
450	451.38	June 30, 1955
460	467.41	July 6, 1955
470	472.53	September 2, 1955
480	480.93	September 13, 1955
490	491.68	March 5, 1956
500	500.24	March 12, 1956
520	521.05	April 6, 1956
540	543.36	October 10, 1958
560	561.13	November 11, 1958
580	581.80	December 30, 1958
600	602.21	February 20, 1959
620	624.06	April 17, 1959
640	643.79	May 29, 1959
660	660.09	July 6, 1959
680	685.47	January 5, 1960
700	705.52	May 17, 1961
720	720.69	August 4, 1961
740	740.34	September 11, 1963
760	760.50	October 29, 1963
780	781.31	January 22, 1964
800	800.14	February 28, 1964
820	820.25	March 18, 1964
840	841.47	July 2, 1964
860	867.13	September 11, 1964
880	881.50	October 20, 1964
900	900.95	January 28, 1965
920	922.31	April 30, 1965
940	942.65	October 11, 1965
960	960.82	October 29, 1965
980	981.62	January 5, 1966

=== The 1970s Bear Market (1972–1973) ===
Milestone	Closing level	Date first achieved
995.15^{7}	995.26	November 10, 1972
1,000^{8}	1,003.16	November 14, 1972
1,050	1,051.70	January 11, 1973

=== The 1980s Bull Market (1982–1987) ===
Milestone	Closing level	Date first achieved
1,051.70^{9}	1,065.49	November 3, 1982
1,100	1,121.81	February 24, 1983
1,150	1,156.64	April 13, 1983
1,200	1,209.46	April 26, 1983
1,250	1,257.52	September 22, 1983
1,300	1,304.88	May 20, 1985
1,350	1,357.97	July 17, 1985
1,400	1,403.44	November 6, 1985
1,450	1,462.27	November 21, 1985
1,500	1,511.70	December 11, 1985
1,550	1,553.10	December 16, 1985
1,600	1,600.69	February 6, 1986
1,650	1,664.45	February 14, 1986
1,700	1,713.99	February 27, 1986
1,750	1,753.71	March 13, 1986
1,800	1,804.24	March 20, 1986
1,850	1,855.03	April 17, 1986
1,900	1,903.54	July 1, 1986
1,950	1,955.97	December 2, 1986
2,000	2,002.25	January 8, 1987
2,050	2,070.73	January 15, 1987
2,100	2,102.50	January 19, 1987
2,150	2,150.45	January 27, 1987
2,200	2,201.49	February 5, 1987
2,250	2,257.45	March 4, 1987
2,300	2,333.52	March 20, 1987
2,350	2,363.78	March 23, 1987
2,400	2,405.54	April 6, 1987
2,450	2,451.05	June 25, 1987
2,500	2,510.04	July 17, 1987
2,550	2,567.44	July 30, 1987
2,600	2,635.84	August 10, 1987
2,650	2,680.47	August 11, 1987
2,700	2,700.57	August 17, 1987

=== The 1990s Bull Acceleration (1989–2000) ===
Milestone	Closing level	Date first achieved
2,722.42^{10}	2,734.64	August 24, 1989
2,750	2,752.09	September 1, 1989
2,800	2,810.15	January 2, 1990
2,850	2,852.23	May 22, 1990
2,900	2,900.97	June 1, 1990
2,950	2,969.80	July 12, 1990
3,000^{11}	3,004.46	April 17, 1991
3,100	3,101.52	December 27, 1991
3,200	3,201.48	January 3, 1992
3,300	3,306.13	April 14, 1992
3,400	3,413.21	June 1, 1992
3,500	3,500.03	May 19, 1993
3,600	3,604.86	August 18, 1993
3,700	3,710.77	November 16, 1993
3,800	3,803.88	January 6, 1994
3,900	3,914.48	January 21, 1994
4,000^{12}	4,003.33	February 23, 1995
4,100	4,138.66	March 24, 1995
4,200	4,201.61	April 4, 1995
4,300	4,303.98	April 24, 1995
4,400	4,404.62	May 10, 1995
4,500	4,510.79	June 16, 1995
4,600	4,615.23	July 5, 1995
4,700	4,702.73	July 7, 1995
4,800	4,801.80	September 14, 1995
4,900	4,922.75	November 15, 1995
5,000	5,023.55	November 21, 1995
5,100	5,105.56	November 29, 1995
5,200	5,216.47	December 13, 1995
5,300	5,304.98	January 29, 1996
5,400	5,405.05	February 1, 1996
5,500	5,539.45	February 8, 1996
5,600	5,600.14	February 12, 1996
5,700	5,748.82	May 20, 1996
5,800	5,838.52	September 13, 1996
5,900	5,904.90	October 1, 1996
6,000	6,010.00	October 14, 1996
6,100	6,177.71	November 6, 1996
6,200	6,206.03	November 7, 1996
6,300	6,312.99	November 14, 1996
6,400	6,430.02	November 20, 1996
6,500	6,547.79	November 25, 1996
6,600	6,600.65	January 7, 1997
6,700	6,703.79	January 10, 1997
6,800	6,833.09	January 17, 1997
6,900	6,961.63	February 12, 1997
7,000	7,022.43	February 13, 1997
7,100	7,214.48	May 5, 1997
7,200	7,214.48	May 5, 1997
7,300	7,333.54	May 15, 1997
7,400	7,435.77	June 6, 1997
7,500	7,539.27	June 10, 1997
7,600	7,711.46	June 12, 1997
7,700	7,711.46	June 12, 1997
7,800	7,895.80	July 3, 1997
7,900	7,962.30	July 8, 1997
8,000	8,038.88	July 16, 1997
8,100	8,116.92	July 24, 1997
8,200	8,254.89	July 30, 1997
8,300	8,314.54	February 11, 1998
8,400	8,451.05	February 18, 1998
8,500	8,545.71	February 27, 1998
8,600	8,643.11	March 10, 1998
8,700	8,718.84	March 16, 1998
8,800	8,803.04	March 19, 1998
8,900	8,906.42	March 20, 1998
9,000	9,033.22	April 6, 1998
9,100	9,110.19	April 14, 1998
9,200	9,211.83	May 13, 1998
9,300	9,328.18	July 16, 1998
9,400	9,544.97	January 6, 1999
9,500	9,544.97	January 6, 1999
9,600	9,643.32	January 8, 1999
9,700	9,736.07	March 5, 1999
9,800	9,897.44	March 11, 1999
9,900	9,958.77	March 15, 1999
10,000^{13}	10,006.78	March 29, 1999
10,200	10,339.51	April 12, 1999
10,400	10,411.66	April 14, 1999
10,600	10,727.18	April 22, 1999
10,800	10,837.71	April 27, 1999
11,000	11,014.69	May 3, 1999
11,200	11,200.98	July 12, 1999
11,400	11,405.76	December 23, 1999
11,600	11,722.98	January 14, 2000

=== The 2000s Cyclical Bull Market (2006–2007) ===
Milestone	Closing level	Date first achieved
11,722.98^{14}	11,727.34	October 3, 2006
11,800	11,850.61	October 4, 2006
12,000	12,011.73	October 19, 2006
12,200	12,218.01	November 14, 2006
12,400	12,416.76	December 14, 2006
12,600	12,621.77	January 24, 2007
12,800	12,803.84	April 18, 2007
13,000	13,089.89	April 25, 2007
13,200	13,211.88	May 2, 2007
13,400	13,487.53	May 16, 2007
13,600	13,633.08	May 30, 2007
13,800	13,861.73	July 12, 2007
14,000	14,000.41	July 19, 2007

=== The 2010s Bull Market (2013–2020) ===
Milestone	Closing level	Date first achieved
14,164.53^{15}	14,253.77	March 5, 2013
14,200	14,253.77	March 5, 2013
14,400	14,447.29	March 11, 2013
14,600	14,662.01	April 2, 2013
14,800	14,802.24	April 10, 2013
15,000^{16}	15,056.20	May 7, 2013
15,200	15,215.25	May 14, 2013
15,400	15,409.39	May 28, 2013
15,600	15,628.02	August 1, 2013
15,800	15,821.63	November 13, 2013
16,000	16,009.99	November 21, 2013
16,200	16,221.14	December 20, 2013
16,400	16,479.88	December 26, 2013
16,600	16,695.47	May 12, 2014
16,800	16,836.11	June 5, 2014
17,000	17,068.26	July 3, 2014
17,200	17,265.99	September 18, 2014
17,400	17,484.53	November 5, 2014
17,600	17,613.74	November 10, 2014
17,800	17,810.06	November 21, 2014
18,000	18,024.17	December 23, 2014
18,200	18,209.19	February 24, 2015
18,312.39^{17}	18,347.67	July 12, 2016
18,400	18,506.41	July 14, 2016
18,600	18,613.52	August 11, 2016
18,800	18,807.88	November 10, 2016
19,000	19,023.87	November 22, 2016
19,200^{18}	19,216.24	December 5, 2016
19,400	19,549.62	December 7, 2016
19,600	19,614.81	December 8, 2016
19,800	19,911.21	December 13, 2016
20,000	20,068.51	January 25, 2017
20,500	20,504.41	February 14, 2017
21,000	21,115.55	March 1, 2017
21,500	21,528.99	June 19, 2017
22,000	22,016.24	August 2, 2017
22,500	22,557.60	October 2, 2017
23,000	23,157.60	October 18, 2017
23,500	23,516.26	November 2, 2017
24,000	24,272.35	November 30, 2017
24,500	24,504.80	December 12, 2017
25,000	25,075.13	January 4, 2018
25,500	25,574.73	January 11, 2018
26,000^{19}	26,115.65	January 17, 2018
26,500	26,616.71	January 26, 2018
27,000	27,088.08	July 11, 2019
27,500	27,674.80	November 7, 2019
28,000	28,004.89	November 15, 2019
28,500	28,551.53	December 23, 2019
29,000^{20}	29,030.22	January 15, 2020
29,500	29,551.42	February 12, 2020

=== The 2020s Bull Market (2020–Present) ===
Milestone	Closing level	Date first achieved
29,551.42^{21}	29,950.44	November 16, 2020
30,000	30,046.24	November 24, 2020
30,500	30,606.48	December 31, 2020
31,000	31,041.13	January 7, 2021
31,500	31,522.75	February 16, 2021
32,000	32,297.02	March 10, 2021
32,500	32,778.64	March 12, 2021
33,000^{22}	33,015.37	March 17, 2021
33,500	33,527.19	April 5, 2021
34,000	34,035.99	April 15, 2021
34,500	34,548.53	May 6, 2021
35,000^{23}	35,061.55	July 23, 2021
35,500	35,515.38	August 13, 2021
36,000	36,052.63	November 2, 2021
36,500	36,585.06	January 3, 2022
37,000	37,090.24	December 13, 2023
37,500	37,557.92	December 19, 2023
38,000	38,001.81	January 22, 2024
38,500	38,519.84	February 1, 2024
39,000	39,069.11	February 22, 2024
39,500	39,512.13	March 20, 2024
40,000	40,003.59	May 17, 2024
40,500	40,954.48	July 16, 2024
41,000	41,198.08	July 17, 2024
41,500	41,563.08	August 30, 2024
42,000	42,025.19	September 19, 2024
42,500	42,512.00	October 9, 2024
43,000	43,065.22	October 14, 2024
43,500	43,729.93	November 6, 2024
44,000	44,293.13	November 11, 2024
44,500	44,736.57	November 25, 2024
45,000	45,014.04	December 4, 2024
45,500	45,631.74	August 22, 2025
46,000	46,108.00	September 11, 2025
46,500	46,519.72	October 2, 2025
47,000	47,207.12	October 24, 2025
47,500	47,544.59	October 27, 2025
48,000	48,254.82	November 12, 2025
48,500	48,704.01	December 11, 2025
49,000	49,462.08	January 6, 2026
49,500	49,504.07	January 9, 2026
50,000	50,115.67	February 6, 2026
51,000	51,032.46	May 29, 2026
52,000	52,182.74	June 29, 2026
53,000	53,055.91	July 6, 2026
54,000	54,085.88	August 4, 2026

== Notes ==
^{1}This was the Dow's very first close on February 16, 1885.

^{2}This was the Dow's close at the peak on June 4, 1890.

^{3}This was the Dow's close at the peak on January 19, 1906.

^{4}This was the Dow's close at the peak on November 3, 1919.

^{5}This was the Dow's close at the peak of the 1920s bull market on Tuesday, September 3, 1929, before the stock market crash. This level would not be seen again until Tuesday, November 23, 1954, more than 25 years later.

^{6}This was the Dow's close at the peak of March 10, 1937.

^{7}This was the Dow's close at the peak on February 9, 1966.

^{8}The Dow first exceeded 1,000 during the trading day on Tuesday, January 18, 1966, but dropped back before closing that day. It would take almost seven years before it finally closed above 1,000 for the first time on Tuesday, November 14, 1972.

^{9}This was the Dow's close at the peak on January 11, 1973, before the 1973–74 stock market crash.

^{10}This was the Dow's close at the peak of August 25, 1987 before the Black Monday stock market crash.

^{11}The Dow reached an intraday high above 3,000 for the first time on Friday, July 13, 1990, before falling back below by the close. The average closed at 2,999.75 on Monday, July 16, 1990, and closed unchanged the following day; however, it would take until April 17 of the next year for the Dow to finally close above 3,000.

^{12}The Dow first exceeded 4,000 during the trading day on Monday, January 31, 1994, but dropped back before closing that day. It would take just over another year before it finally closed above 4,000 for the first time on Thursday, February 23, 1995.

^{13}The Dow first traded above 10,000 on Tuesday, March 16, 1999, but dropped back before closing that day. The Dow closed at 9,997.62 on Thursday, March 18, 1999. It would take nearly two weeks to close above 10,000 on Monday, March 29, 1999.

^{14}This was the Dow's close at the peak on January 14, 2000, before the dot-com crash.

^{15}This was the Dow's close at the peak on October 9, 2007, before the 2008 financial crisis.

^{16}The Dow first traded above 15,000 on Friday, May 3, 2013, but dropped back before closing that day, it then closed above 15,000 on Tuesday, May 7, 2013.

^{17}This was the Dow's close at the peak on May 19, 2015, before the 2015-16 stock market selloff.

^{18}The Dow first traded above 19,200 during the session on Wednesday, November 30, 2016, then flirted with the same milestone the next day. However, Monday, December 5, 2016, was when the Dow first closed above 19,200.

^{19}The Dow first traded above 26,000 on Tuesday, January 16, 2018, but dropped back before closing that day, it then closed above 26,000 on Wednesday, January 17, 2018.

^{20}The Dow first traded above 29,000 on Friday, January 10, 2020, and again on Tuesday, January 14, 2020, but dropped back before closing on both days, it then closed above 29,000 on Wednesday, January 15, 2020.

^{21}After peaking on February 12, 2020, the Dow Jones rapidly fell into correction later that same month and into bear market territory in the next month amid the COVID-19 pandemic.

^{22}This was the fastest 1,000 point gain taking only 5 trading days from closing above 32,000 to close above 33,000.

^{23}The Dow first traded above 35,000 on Monday, May 10, 2021, before closing below it for the day. After two and a half months worth of several attempts, the Dow finally closed above 35,000 on Friday, July 23, 2021.

== Complete list of record closes ==
The following is a list of the record closes of the Dow Jones Industrial Average grouped by year since May 26, 1896.

=== 1896 (7 record closes) ===
Date of Record	Closing Level
May 26, 1896	40.94
November 4, 1896	42.79
November 6, 1896	43.33
November 7, 1896	44.08
November 9, 1896	44.44
November 10, 1896	44.56
November 12, 1896	44.90

=== 1897 (29 record closes) ===
Date of Record	Closing Level
July 12, 1897	45.05
July 13, 1897	45.61
July 14, 1897	45.71
July 19, 1897	46.45
July 20, 1897	46.76
July 21, 1897	46.95
July 22, 1897	47.73
July 23, 1897	47.88
July 24, 1897	47.92
July 30, 1897	47.95
August 2, 1897	48.84
August 3, 1897	50.10
August 4, 1897	50.74
August 5, 1897	51.25
August 6, 1897	51.72
August 7, 1897	51.80
August 12, 1897	51.97
August 16, 1897	52.19
August 23, 1897	52.39
August 24, 1897	52.53
August 26, 1897	52.56
August 27, 1897	52.92
August 28, 1897	53.10
August 30, 1897	53.23
August 31, 1897	54.81
September 1, 1897	55.44
September 2, 1897	55.77
September 9, 1897	55.81
September 10, 1897	55.82

=== 1898 (14 record closes) ===
Date of Record	Closing Level
August 5, 1898	55.85
August 6, 1898	55.93
August 8, 1898	56.31
August 10, 1898	56.61
August 13, 1898	56.83
August 15, 1898	57.50
August 16, 1898	58.45
August 17, 1898	58.89
August 19, 1898	59.09
August 22, 1898	59.39
August 23, 1898	59.63
August 24, 1898	59.72
August 25, 1898	60.52
August 26, 1898	60.97

=== 1899 (34 record closes) ===
Date of Record	Closing Level
January 7, 1899	61.35
January 9, 1899	61.98
January 19, 1899	62.30
January 20, 1899	62.40
January 25, 1899	63.05
January 26, 1899	63.83
January 27, 1899	64.64
January 28, 1899	64.87
January 30, 1899	65.02
February 20, 1899	66.76
February 21, 1899	66.89
February 23, 1899	67.32
February 24, 1899	67.35
February 25, 1899	67.52
March 9, 1899	67.66
March 10, 1899	68.14
March 11, 1899	68.16
March 13, 1899	68.89
March 14, 1899	68.98
March 16, 1899	70.71
March 17, 1899	71.26
March 18, 1899	72.02
March 25, 1899	72.40
March 27, 1899	73.73
March 28, 1899	74.70
April 1, 1899	75.15
April 3, 1899	76.02
April 4, 1899	76.04
April 15, 1899	76.30
April 18, 1899	76.36
April 21, 1899	76.71
April 22, 1899	77.01
April 25, 1899	77.28
September 5, 1899	77.61

=== 1901 (2 record closes) ===
Date of Record	Closing Level
June 3, 1901	77.73
June 17, 1901	78.26

=== 1905 (31 record closes) ===
Date of Record	Closing Level
March 24, 1905	79.27
March 31, 1905	80.02
April 1, 1905	80.67
April 3, 1905	81.13
April 4, 1905	81.31
April 5, 1905	82.17
April 6, 1905	82.76
April 7, 1905	83.12
April 13, 1905	83.23
April 14, 1905	83.75
October 31, 1905	83.77
November 1, 1905	84.14
November 17, 1905	84.19
November 18, 1905	84.53
November 20, 1905	85.22
November 21, 1905	85.84
November 22, 1905	86.11
November 25, 1905	86.94
November 27, 1905	89.43
November 28, 1905	89.77
November 29, 1905	89.89
December 5, 1905	90.82
December 6, 1905	90.91
December 7, 1905	92.37
December 8, 1905	93.20
December 11, 1905	93.59
December 12, 1905	95.13
December 13, 1905	95.68
December 15, 1905	96.05
December 16, 1905	96.09
December 29, 1905	96.56

=== 1906 (10 record closes) ===
Date of Record	Closing Level
January 6, 1906	97.09
January 8, 1906	98.03
January 10, 1906	98.09
January 11, 1906	99.06
January 12, 1906	100.25
January 15, 1906	100.80
January 16, 1906	100.81
January 17, 1906	101.67
January 18, 1906	102.26
January 19, 1906	103.00

=== 1916 (14 record closes) ===
Date of Record	Closing Level
September 28, 1916	103.11
September 29, 1916	103.73
October 5, 1916	104.15
October 23, 1916	105.17
October 27, 1916	105.28
November 1, 1916	105.90
November 3, 1916	106.28
November 6, 1916	107.21
November 9, 1916	107.68
November 15, 1916	107.72
November 16, 1916	108.48
November 17, 1916	109.62
November 18, 1916	110.13
November 21, 1916	110.15

=== 1919 (11 record closes) ===
Date of Record	Closing Level
July 9, 1919	110.46
July 12, 1919	110.71
July 14, 1919	112.23
October 7, 1919	112.55
October 8, 1919	113.55
October 10, 1919	114.42
October 20, 1919	115.43
October 21, 1919	115.62
October 22, 1919	117.62
October 31, 1919	118.92
November 3, 1919	119.62

=== 1924 (1 record close) ===
Date of Record	Closing Level
December 31, 1924	120.51

=== 1925 (65 record closes) ===
Date of Record	Closing Level
January 2, 1925	121.25
January 3, 1925	122.20
January 9, 1925	122.32
January 12, 1925	123.21
January 13, 1925	123.56
January 22, 1925	123.60
March 2, 1925	123.93
March 3, 1925	125.25
March 6, 1925	125.68
May 15, 1925	126.00
May 16, 1925	126.50
May 18, 1925	127.09
May 19, 1925	128.38
May 20, 1925	128.68
May 21, 1925	128.70
May 22, 1925	128.95
May 27, 1925	129.13
May 28, 1925	129.60
May 29, 1925	129.95
June 2, 1925	130.42
June 30, 1925	131.01
July 1, 1925	131.76
July 6, 1925	132.31
July 7, 1925	132.70
July 8, 1925	133.07
July 15, 1925	133.40
July 16, 1925	133.50
July 17, 1925	134.00
July 18, 1925	134.68
July 20, 1925	135.00
July 23, 1925	135.33
July 24, 1925	135.58
July 25, 1925	135.63
July 27, 1925	136.50
August 7, 1925	137.40
August 8, 1925	137.98
August 13, 1925	138.60
August 14, 1925	139.51
August 15, 1925	140.20
August 17, 1925	141.56
August 18, 1925	142.60
August 21, 1925	142.63
August 22, 1925	142.87
August 25, 1925	143.18
September 10, 1925	143.83
September 11, 1925	145.38
September 12, 1925	145.95
September 14, 1925	146.63
September 18, 1925	147.16
September 19, 1925	147.73
October 14, 1925	148.96
October 15, 1925	149.18
October 16, 1925	149.56
October 20, 1925	150.29
October 21, 1925	151.61
October 22, 1925	152.13
October 23, 1925	153.29
October 24, 1925	153.47
October 26, 1925	153.60
October 28, 1925	155.25
October 30, 1925	155.65
October 31, 1925	156.52
November 2, 1925	157.88
November 4, 1925	158.05
November 6, 1925	159.39

=== 1926 (9 record closes) ===
Date of Record	Closing Level
February 3, 1926	159.40
February 4, 1926	160.53
February 10, 1926	161.58
February 11, 1926	162.31
August 3, 1926	163.40
August 6, 1926	164.16
August 7, 1926	165.21
August 9, 1926	166.14
August 14, 1926	166.64

=== 1927 (48 record closes) ===
Date of Record	Closing Level
April 21, 1927	166.66
April 22, 1927	167.36
May 4, 1927	168.05
May 9, 1927	168.15
May 10, 1927	168.25
May 14, 1927	168.46
May 18, 1927	168.98
May 19, 1927	170.29
May 20, 1927	171.75
May 21, 1927	172.06
May 27, 1927	172.15
May 28, 1927	172.56
May 31, 1927	172.96
July 12, 1927	173.11
July 13, 1927	173.19
July 14, 1927	174.38
July 15, 1927	174.87
July 16, 1927	174.93
July 18, 1927	175.40
July 19, 1927	177.02
July 20, 1927	177.83
July 23, 1927	178.11
July 25, 1927	179.28
July 26, 1927	179.72
July 27, 1927	180.09
July 28, 1927	180.73
July 29, 1927	181.40
July 30, 1927	182.61
August 1, 1927	184.21
August 2, 1927	185.55
August 20, 1927	185.80
August 22, 1927	187.32
August 23, 1927	187.49
August 24, 1927	188.07
August 26, 1927	188.81
August 27, 1927	189.30
August 29, 1927	190.00
August 30, 1927	190.63
September 1, 1927	191.56
September 2, 1927	192.83
September 6, 1927	196.91
September 7, 1927	197.75
September 14, 1927	198.00
September 15, 1927	198.97
October 3, 1927	199.78
December 17, 1927	199.95
December 19, 1927	200.93
December 31, 1927	202.40

=== 1928 (58 record closes) ===
Date of Record	Closing Level
January 3, 1928	203.35
March 16, 1928	204.70
March 20, 1928	205.23
March 21, 1928	206.78
March 23, 1928	208.56
March 24, 1928	209.10
March 26, 1928	210.36
March 27, 1928	210.38
March 29, 1928	210.76
March 30, 1928	214.45
April 13, 1928	216.93
May 4, 1928	217.66
May 7, 1928	219.51
May 8, 1928	220.09
May 11, 1928	220.74
May 14, 1928	220.88
June 2, 1928	220.96
August 16, 1928	221.34
August 17, 1928	222.41
August 18, 1928	223.61
August 20, 1928	225.77
August 21, 1928	228.79
August 22, 1928	229.71
August 24, 1928	233.68
August 25, 1928	234.98
August 28, 1928	236.55
August 29, 1928	238.28
August 30, 1928	238.85
August 31, 1928	240.41
September 7, 1928	241.72
October 9, 1928	241.73
October 10, 1928	246.53
October 11, 1928	247.69
October 13, 1928	249.13
October 15, 1928	249.85
October 17, 1928	250.87
October 18, 1928	251.88
October 19, 1928	256.59
October 24, 1928	257.03
October 29, 1928	257.13
November 5, 1928	257.58
November 7, 1928	260.68
November 8, 1928	261.11
November 9, 1928	263.05
November 10, 1928	265.58
November 12, 1928	269.67
November 13, 1928	269.89
November 16, 1928	276.66
November 17, 1928	277.48
November 19, 1928	278.78
November 20, 1928	283.90
November 22, 1928	290.34
November 26, 1928	291.16
November 27, 1928	292.39
November 28, 1928	295.62
December 28, 1928	296.52
December 29, 1928	297.28
December 31, 1928	300.00

=== 1929 (33 record closes) ===
Date of Record	Closing Level
January 2, 1929	307.01
January 22, 1929	307.06
January 23, 1929	310.33
January 25, 1929	315.13
January 31, 1929	317.51
February 1, 1929	319.68
February 2, 1929	319.76
February 5, 1929	322.06
May 3, 1929	325.56
May 4, 1929	327.08
June 26, 1929	328.60
June 27, 1929	328.91
June 28, 1929	331.65
June 29, 1929	333.79
July 1, 1929	335.22
July 2, 1929	340.28
July 3, 1929	341.99
July 5, 1929	344.27
July 6, 1929	344.66
July 8, 1929	346.55
July 31, 1929	347.70
August 1, 1929	350.56
August 2, 1929	353.08
August 3, 1929	355.62
August 16, 1929	361.49
August 19, 1929	365.20
August 20, 1929	367.67
August 22, 1929	369.95
August 23, 1929	374.61
August 24, 1929	375.44
August 29, 1929	376.18
August 30, 1929	380.33
September 3, 1929	381.17

=== 1954 (13 record closes) ===
Date of Record	Closing Level
November 23, 1954	382.74
November 24, 1954	384.63
November 26, 1954	387.79
November 29, 1954	388.51
December 3, 1954	389.60
December 6, 1954	392.48
December 7, 1954	393.88
December 17, 1954	394.94
December 20, 1954	397.32
December 21, 1954	398.11
December 28, 1954	398.51
December 29, 1954	401.97
December 31, 1954	404.39

=== 1955 (49 record closes) ===
Date of Record	Closing Level
January 3, 1955	408.89
February 1, 1955	409.70
February 4, 1955	409.76
February 9, 1955	410.32
February 10, 1955	412.89
February 11, 1955	413.99
March 2, 1955	417.18
March 3, 1955	418.33
March 4, 1955	419.68
April 12, 1955	420.94
April 13, 1955	421.57
April 14, 1955	422.46
April 15, 1955	425.45
April 18, 1955	428.42
April 20, 1955	428.62
April 26, 1955	430.64
June 6, 1955	431.49
June 7, 1955	434.55
June 8, 1955	436.95
June 10, 1955	437.72
June 13, 1955	440.17
June 15, 1955	441.93
June 16, 1955	442.48
June 17, 1955	444.08
June 20, 1955	444.38
June 21, 1955	446.80
June 22, 1955	447.37
June 23, 1955	448.82
June 24, 1955	448.93
June 27, 1955	449.86
June 30, 1955	451.38
July 1, 1955	453.82
July 5, 1955	459.42
July 6, 1955	467.41
July 25, 1955	468.02
July 26, 1955	468.41
July 27, 1955	468.45
September 1, 1955	469.63
September 2, 1955	472.53
September 6, 1955	476.24
September 12, 1955	476.51
September 13, 1955	480.93
September 14, 1955	482.90
September 16, 1955	483.67
September 19, 1955	483.80
September 21, 1955	485.98
September 23, 1955	487.45
December 8, 1955	487.80
December 30, 1955	488.40

=== 1956 (15 record closes) ===
Date of Record	Closing Level
March 2, 1956	488.84
March 5, 1956	491.68
March 8, 1956	492.36
March 9, 1956	497.84
March 12, 1956	500.24
March 14, 1956	503.88
March 15, 1956	507.50
March 16, 1956	507.60
March 19, 1956	509.76
March 20, 1956	512.62
March 23, 1956	513.03
April 2, 1956	515.10
April 3, 1956	515.91
April 4, 1956	518.65
April 6, 1956	521.05

=== 1958 (25 record closes) ===
Date of Record	Closing Level
September 15, 1958	523.40
September 16, 1958	526.57
September 24, 1958	528.15
September 29, 1958	529.04
September 30, 1958	532.09
October 3, 1958	533.73
October 6, 1958	536.29
October 7, 1958	539.40
October 9, 1958	539.61
October 10, 1958	543.36
October 13, 1958	545.95
October 17, 1958	546.36
November 5, 1958	550.68
November 6, 1958	554.85
November 10, 1958	557.72
November 11, 1958	561.13
November 12, 1958	562.39
November 14, 1958	564.68
November 17, 1958	567.44
December 17, 1958	569.38
December 18, 1958	572.38
December 19, 1958	573.17
December 29, 1958	577.31
December 30, 1958	581.80
December 31, 1958	583.65

=== 1959 (39 record closes) ===
Date of Record	Closing Level
January 2, 1959	587.59
January 5, 1959	590.17
January 6, 1959	591.37
January 9, 1959	592.72
January 15, 1959	594.81
January 16, 1959	595.75
January 21, 1959	597.66
February 20, 1959	602.21
February 24, 1959	602.91
February 27, 1959	603.50
March 2, 1959	605.03
March 3, 1959	610.78
March 4, 1959	611.84
March 5, 1959	611.87
March 12, 1959	613.75
March 13, 1959	614.69
April 16, 1959	617.58
April 17, 1959	624.06
April 20, 1959	627.08
April 21, 1959	629.23
April 27, 1959	629.87
May 13, 1959	633.05
May 14, 1959	637.04
May 28, 1959	639.58
May 29, 1959	643.79
July 1, 1959	650.88
July 2, 1959	654.76
July 6, 1959	660.09
July 7, 1959	663.21
July 8, 1959	663.81
July 22, 1959	664.38
July 23, 1959	664.63
July 27, 1959	669.08
July 28, 1959	672.04
July 29, 1959	673.18
July 30, 1959	673.37
July 31, 1959	674.88
August 3, 1959	678.10
December 31, 1959	679.36

=== 1960 (1 record close) ===
Date of Record	Closing Level
January 5, 1960	685.47

=== 1961 (19 record closes) ===
Date of Record	Closing Level
April 10, 1961	692.06
April 11, 1961	694.11
April 17, 1961	696.72
May 16, 1961	697.74
May 17, 1961	705.52
May 19, 1961	705.96
August 1, 1961	713.94
August 3, 1961	715.71
August 4, 1961	720.69
August 11, 1961	722.61
August 18, 1961	723.54
August 21, 1961	724.75
August 22, 1961	725.76
September 6, 1961	726.01
September 7, 1961	726.53
November 13, 1961	728.43
November 14, 1961	732.56
November 15, 1961	734.34
December 13, 1961	734.91

=== 1963 (14 record closes) ===
Date of Record	Closing Level
September 5, 1963	737.98
September 11, 1963	740.34
September 19, 1963	743.22
September 20, 1963	743.60
September 24, 1963	745.96
October 16, 1963	748.45
October 17, 1963	750.77
October 21, 1963	752.31
October 25, 1963	755.61
October 28, 1963	759.39
October 29, 1963	760.50
December 5, 1963	763.86
December 17, 1963	766.38
December 18, 1963	767.21

=== 1964 (62 record closes) ===
Date of Record	Closing Level
January 3, 1964	767.68
January 6, 1964	769.51
January 7, 1964	771.73
January 8, 1964	774.46
January 9, 1964	776.55
January 22, 1964	781.31
January 23, 1964	782.86
January 24, 1964	783.04
January 27, 1964	785.34
January 28, 1964	787.78
February 7, 1964	791.59
February 11, 1964	792.16
February 12, 1964	794.82
February 17, 1964	796.19
February 20, 1964	796.99
February 24, 1964	797.12
February 26, 1964	799.38
February 28, 1964	800.14
March 2, 1964	802.75
March 3, 1964	805.72
March 6, 1964	806.03
March 9, 1964	807.18
March 10, 1964	809.39
March 11, 1964	813.87
March 12, 1964	814.22
March 13, 1964	816.22
March 16, 1964	816.48
March 17, 1964	818.16
March 18, 1964	820.25
April 2, 1964	820.87
April 3, 1964	822.99
April 6, 1964	824.76
April 15, 1964	825.43
April 16, 1964	825.65
April 17, 1964	827.33
May 6, 1964	828.18
May 7, 1964	830.17
June 26, 1964	830.99
June 30, 1964	831.50
July 1, 1964	838.06
July 2, 1964	841.47
July 6, 1964	844.24
July 7, 1964	844.94
July 8, 1964	845.45
July 10, 1964	847.51
July 17, 1964	851.35
September 8, 1964	851.91
September 9, 1964	855.57
September 10, 1964	859.50
September 11, 1964	867.13
September 17, 1964	868.67
September 21, 1964	871.58
September 22, 1964	872.47
September 24, 1964	872.98
September 25, 1964	874.71
September 28, 1964	875.46
September 29, 1964	875.74
October 5, 1964	877.15
October 9, 1964	878.08
October 20, 1964	881.50
November 17, 1964	885.39
November 18, 1964	891.71

=== 1965 (39 record closes) ===
Date of Record	Closing Level
January 18, 1965	895.21
January 19, 1965	896.27
January 25, 1965	896.46
January 26, 1965	897.84
January 27, 1965	899.52
January 28, 1965	900.95
January 29, 1965	902.86
February 1, 1965	903.68
February 2, 1965	903.77
February 3, 1965	906.30
April 12, 1965	906.36
April 13, 1965	908.01
April 14, 1965	912.86
April 22, 1965	915.06
April 23, 1965	916.41
April 26, 1965	916.86
April 27, 1965	918.16
April 28, 1965	918.86
April 30, 1965	922.31
May 4, 1965	928.22
May 5, 1965	932.22
May 6, 1965	933.52
May 12, 1965	934.17
May 13, 1965	938.87
May 14, 1965	939.62
October 11, 1965	942.65
October 18, 1965	945.84
October 19, 1965	947.76
October 20, 1965	948.47
October 21, 1965	950.28
October 22, 1965	952.42
October 26, 1965	956.32
October 27, 1965	959.50
October 29, 1965	960.82
November 3, 1965	961.13
November 4, 1965	961.85
December 22, 1965	965.86
December 23, 1965	966.36
December 31, 1965	969.26

=== 1966 (8 record closes) ===
Date of Record	Closing Level
January 5, 1966	981.62
January 6, 1966	985.46
January 7, 1966	986.13
January 11, 1966	986.85
January 14, 1966	987.30
January 17, 1966	989.75
January 18, 1966	994.20
February 9, 1966	995.15

=== 1972 (12 record closes) ===
Date of Record	Closing Level
November 10, 1972	995.26
November 13, 1972	997.07
November 14, 1972	1,003.16
November 16, 1972	1,003.69
November 17, 1972	1,005.57
November 21, 1972	1,013.25
November 22, 1972	1,020.54
November 24, 1972	1,025.21
December 4, 1972	1,027.02
December 6, 1972	1,027.54
December 7, 1972	1,033.26
December 11, 1972	1,036.27

=== 1973 (4 record closes) ===
Date of Record	Closing Level
January 3, 1973	1,043.80
January 5, 1973	1,047.49
January 8, 1973	1,047.86
January 11, 1973	1,051.70

=== 1982 (2 record closes) ===
Date of Record	Closing Level
November 3, 1982	1,065.49
December 27, 1982	1,070.55

=== 1983 (30 record closes) ===
Date of Record	Closing Level
January 6, 1983	1,070.92
January 7, 1983	1,076.07
January 10, 1983	1,092.35
February 14, 1983	1,097.10
February 24, 1983	1,121.81
March 1, 1983	1,130.71
March 2, 1983	1,135.06
March 3, 1983	1,138.06
March 4, 1983	1,140.96
March 7, 1983	1,141.74
March 24, 1983	1,145.90
April 13, 1983	1,156.64
April 14, 1983	1,165.25
April 15, 1983	1,171.34
April 18, 1983	1,183.24
April 20, 1983	1,191.47
April 22, 1983	1,196.30
April 26, 1983	1,209.46
April 28, 1983	1,219.52
April 29, 1983	1,226.20
May 6, 1983	1,232.59
June 15, 1983	1,237.28
June 16, 1983	1,248.30
September 20, 1983	1,249.19
September 22, 1983	1,257.52
September 26, 1983	1,260.77
October 6, 1983	1,268.80
October 7, 1983	1,272.15
October 10, 1983	1,284.65
November 29, 1983	1,287.20

=== 1985 (36 record closes) ===
Date of Record	Closing Level
January 29, 1985	1,292.62
February 13, 1985	1,297.92
March 1, 1985	1,299.36
May 20, 1985	1,304.88
May 21, 1985	1,309.70
May 31, 1985	1,315.41
June 5, 1985	1,320.56
June 6, 1985	1,327.28
June 27, 1985	1,332.21
June 28, 1985	1,335.46
July 1, 1985	1,337.14
July 11, 1985	1,337.70
July 12, 1985	1,338.60
July 16, 1985	1,347.89
July 17, 1985	1,357.97
July 19, 1985	1,359.54
October 16, 1985	1,368.50
October 17, 1985	1,369.29
October 30, 1985	1,375.57
November 1, 1985	1,390.25
November 5, 1985	1,396.67
November 6, 1985	1,403.44
November 8, 1985	1,404.36
November 11, 1985	1,431.88
November 12, 1985	1,433.60
November 14, 1985	1,439.22
November 18, 1985	1,440.02
November 21, 1985	1,462.27
November 22, 1985	1,464.33
November 27, 1985	1,475.69
December 4, 1985	1,484.40
December 9, 1985	1,497.02
December 10, 1985	1,499.20
December 11, 1985	1,511.70
December 13, 1985	1,535.21
December 16, 1985	1,553.10

=== 1986 (30 record closes) ===
Date of Record	Closing Level
January 7, 1986	1,565.71
January 31, 1986	1,570.99
February 3, 1986	1,594.27
February 6, 1986	1,600.69
February 7, 1986	1,613.42
February 10, 1986	1,626.38
February 12, 1986	1,629.93
February 13, 1986	1,645.07
February 14, 1986	1,664.45
February 18, 1986	1,678.78
February 21, 1986	1,697.71
February 24, 1986	1,698.28
February 27, 1986	1,713.99
March 11, 1986	1,746.05
March 13, 1986	1,753.71
March 14, 1986	1,792.74
March 20, 1986	1,804.24
March 26, 1986	1,810.70
March 27, 1986	1,821.72
April 16, 1986	1,847.97
April 17, 1986	1,855.03
April 21, 1986	1,855.90
May 28, 1986	1,878.28
May 29, 1986	1,882.35
June 6, 1986	1,885.90
June 30, 1986	1,892.72
July 1, 1986	1,903.54
July 2, 1986	1,909.03
September 4, 1986	1,919.71
December 2, 1986	1,955.57

=== 1987 (55 record closes) ===
Date of Record	Closing Level
January 5, 1987	1,971.32
January 6, 1987	1,974.83
January 7, 1987	1,993.95
January 8, 1987	2,002.25
January 9, 1987	2,005.91
January 12, 1987	2,009.42
January 13, 1987	2,012.94
January 14, 1987	2,035.01
January 15, 1987	2,070.73
January 16, 1987	2,076.63
January 19, 1987	2,102.50
January 20, 1987	2,104.47
January 22, 1987	2,145.67
January 27, 1987	2,150.45
January 28, 1987	2,163.39
February 2, 1987	2,179.42
February 4, 1987	2,191.23
February 5, 1987	2,201.49
February 17, 1987	2,237.49
February 18, 1987	2,237.63
February 19, 1987	2,244.09
March 4, 1987	2,257.45
March 5, 1987	2,276.43
March 6, 1987	2,280.23
March 17, 1987	2,284.80
March 18, 1987	2,286.93
March 19, 1987	2,299.57
March 20, 1987	2,333.52
March 23, 1987	2,363.78
March 24, 1987	2,369.18
March 26, 1987	2,372.59
April 3, 1987	2,390.34
April 6, 1987	2,405.54
June 16, 1987	2,407.35
June 18, 1987	2,408.13
June 19, 1987	2,420.85
June 22, 1987	2,445.51
June 25, 1987	2,451.05
July 8, 1987	2,463.97
July 14, 1987	2,481.35
July 15, 1987	2,483.74
July 16, 1987	2,496.97
July 17, 1987	2,510.04
July 28, 1987	2,519.77
July 29, 1987	2,539.54
July 30, 1987	2,567.44
July 31, 1987	2,572.07
August 6, 1987	2,594.23
August 10, 1987	2,635.84
August 11, 1987	2,680.48
August 13, 1987	2,691.49
August 17, 1987	2,700.57
August 20, 1987	2,706.79
August 21, 1987	2,709.50
August 25, 1987	2,722.42

=== 1989 (8 record closes) ===
Date of Record	Closing Level
August 24, 1989	2,734.64
August 28, 1989	2,743.36
September 1, 1989	2,752.09
October 3, 1989	2,754.56
October 4, 1989	2,771.09
October 5, 1989	2,773.56
October 6, 1989	2,785.52
October 9, 1989	2,791.41

=== 1990 (15 record closes) ===
Date of Record	Closing Level
January 2, 1990	2,810.15
May 14, 1990	2,821.53
May 15, 1990	2,822.45
May 17, 1990	2,831.71
May 21, 1990	2,844.68
May 22, 1990	2,852.23
May 23, 1990	2,856.26
May 29, 1990	2,870.49
May 30, 1990	2,878.56
June 1, 1990	2,900.97
June 4, 1990	2,935.19
June 15, 1990	2,935.89
July 12, 1990	2,969.80
July 13, 1990	2,980.20
July 16, 1990	2,999.75

=== 1991 (11 record closes) ===
Date of Record	Closing Level
April 17, 1991	3,004.46
May 31, 1991	3,027.50
June 3, 1991	3,035.33
August 23, 1991	3,040.25
August 28, 1991	3,055.23
October 16, 1991	3,061.72
October 18, 1991	3,077.15
December 26, 1991	3,082.96
December 27, 1991	3,101.52
December 30, 1991	3,163.91
December 31, 1991	3,168.83

=== 1992 (22 record closes) ===
Date of Record	Closing Level
January 2, 1992	3,172.41
January 3, 1992	3,201.48
January 7, 1992	3,204.83
January 9, 1992	3,209.53
January 14, 1992	3,246.20
January 15, 1992	3,258.50
January 17, 1992	3,264.98
January 28, 1992	3,272.14
February 4, 1992	3,272.81
February 12, 1992	3,276.83
February 20, 1992	3,280.63
February 24, 1992	3,282.42
February 26, 1992	3,283.32
March 3, 1992	3,290.25
April 14, 1992	3,306.13
April 15, 1992	3,353.76
April 16, 1992	3,366.50
May 4, 1992	3,378.13
May 11, 1992	3,397.58
May 19, 1992	3,397.99
May 28, 1992	3,398.43
June 1, 1992	3,413.21

=== 1993 (33 record closes) ===
Date of Record	Closing Level
February 4, 1993	3,416.74
February 5, 1993	3,442.14
March 8, 1993	3,469.42
March 9, 1993	3,472.12
March 10, 1993	3,478.34
April 16, 1993	3,478.61
May 12, 1993	3,482.31
May 19, 1993	3,500.03
May 20, 1993	3,523.28
May 26, 1993	3,540.16
May 27, 1993	3,554.83
July 21, 1993	3,555.40
July 26, 1993	3,567.70
August 9, 1993	3,576.08
August 11, 1993	3,583.35
August 17, 1993	3,586.98
August 18, 1993	3,604.86
August 19, 1993	3,612.13
August 20, 1993	3,615.48
August 24, 1993	3,638.96
August 25, 1993	3,652.09
October 25, 1993	3,673.61
October 28, 1993	3,687.86
November 1, 1993	3,692.61
November 2, 1993	3,697.64
November 16, 1993	3,710.77
December 7, 1993	3,718.88
December 8, 1993	3,734.53
December 10, 1993	3,740.67
December 13, 1993	3,764.43
December 27, 1993	3,792.93
December 28, 1993	3,793.77
December 29, 1993	3,794.33

=== 1994 (12 record closes) ===
Date of Record	Closing Level
January 5, 1994	3,798.82
January 6, 1994	3,803.88
January 7, 1994	3,820.77
January 10, 1994	3,865.51
January 14, 1994	3,867.20
January 17, 1994	3,870.29
January 19, 1994	3,884.37
January 20, 1994	3,891.96
January 21, 1994	3,914.48
January 27, 1994	3,926.30
January 28, 1994	3,945.43
January 31, 1994	3,978.36

=== 1995 (69 record closes) ===
Date of Record	Closing Level
February 15, 1995	3,986.17
February 16, 1995	3,987.52
February 23, 1995	4,003.33
February 24, 1995	4,011.74
March 10, 1995	4,035.60
March 14, 1995	4,048.75
March 16, 1995	4,069.15
March 17, 1995	4,073.65
March 20, 1995	4,083.68
March 23, 1995	4,087.83
March 24, 1995	4,138.66
March 27, 1995	4,157.34
March 29, 1995	4,160.80
March 30, 1995	4,172.56
April 4, 1995	4,201.61
April 6, 1995	4,205.41
April 13, 1995	4,208.18
April 20, 1995	4,230.66
April 21, 1995	4,270.08
April 24, 1995	4,303.98
April 27, 1995	4,314.70
April 28, 1995	4,321.27
May 2, 1995	4,328.88
May 3, 1995	4,373.14
May 8, 1995	4,383.86
May 9, 1995	4,390.78
May 10, 1995	4,404.62
May 11, 1995	4,411.19
May 12, 1995	4,430.55
May 15, 1995	4,437.47
May 24, 1995	4,438.16
May 31, 1995	4,465.14
June 1, 1995	4,472.75
June 5, 1995	4,476.55
June 6, 1995	4,485.20
June 14, 1995	4,491.08
June 15, 1995	4,496.26
June 16, 1995	4,510.79
June 19, 1995	4,553.67
June 22, 1995	4,589.64
July 5, 1995	4,615.23
July 6, 1995	4,664.00
July 7, 1995	4,702.73
July 12, 1995	4,727.28
July 13, 1995	4,727.48
July 17, 1995	4,736.29
September 12, 1995	4,747.21
September 13, 1995	4,765.52
September 14, 1995	4,801.80
October 19, 1995	4,802.45
November 2, 1995	4,808.59
November 3, 1995	4,825.57
November 8, 1995	4,852.66
November 9, 1995	4,864.22
November 10, 1995	4,870.37
November 13, 1995	4,872.89
November 15, 1995	4,922.75
November 16, 1995	4,969.36
November 17, 1995	4,989.95
November 21, 1995	5,023.55
November 22, 1995	5,041.61
November 24, 1995	5,048.84
November 27, 1995	5,070.87
November 28, 1995	5,078.10
November 29, 1995	5,105.56
December 4, 1995	5,139.52
December 5, 1995	5,177.45
December 6, 1995	5,199.13
December 13, 1995	5,216.47

=== 1996 (44 record closes) ===
Date of Record	Closing Level
January 22, 1996	5,219.36
January 24, 1996	5,242.84
January 26, 1996	5,271.74
January 29, 1996	5,304.98
January 30, 1996	5,381.21
January 31, 1996	5,395.30
February 1, 1996	5,405.05
February 5, 1996	5,407.58
February 6, 1996	5,459.61
February 7, 1996	5,492.12
February 8, 1996	5,539.45
February 9, 1996	5,541.62
February 12, 1996	5,600.14
February 13, 1996	5,601.23
February 22, 1996	5,608.45
February 23, 1996	5,630.49
March 5, 1996	5,642.41
March 18, 1996	5,683.60
April 3, 1996	5,689.74
May 20, 1996	5,748.82
May 22, 1996	5,778.00
September 13, 1996	5,838.52
September 16, 1996	5,889.19
September 23, 1996	5,894.74
October 1, 1996	5,904.90
October 2, 1996	5,933.97
October 4, 1996	5,992.85
October 14, 1996	6,010.00
October 16, 1996	6,020.80
October 17, 1996	6,059.19
October 18, 1996	6,094.22
November 6, 1996	6,177.71
November 7, 1996	6,206.03
November 8, 1996	6,219.82
November 11, 1996	6,255.60
November 12, 1996	6,266.03
November 13, 1996	6,274.23
November 14, 1996	6,312.99
November 15, 1996	6,348.03
November 19, 1996	6,397.59
November 20, 1996	6,430.02
November 22, 1996	6,471.76
November 25, 1996	6,547.79
December 27, 1996	6,560.90

=== 1997 (39 record closes) ===
Date of Record	Closing Level
January 6, 1997	6,567.17
January 7, 1997	6,600.65
January 9, 1997	6,625.67
January 10, 1997	6,703.79
January 13, 1997	6,709.18
January 14, 1997	6,762.28
January 16, 1997	6,765.36
January 17, 1997	6,833.09
January 20, 1997	6,843.87
January 21, 1997	6,883.89
February 12, 1997	6,961.63
February 13, 1997	7,022.43
February 18, 1997	7,067.46
March 10, 1997	7,079.39
March 11, 1997	7,085.16
May 5, 1997	7,214.48
May 6, 1997	7,225.32
May 12, 1997	7,292.74
May 15, 1997	7,333.54
May 23, 1997	7,345.90
May 27, 1997	7,383.40
June 6, 1997	7,435.77
June 9, 1997	7,478.49
June 10, 1997	7,539.27
June 11, 1997	7,575.82
June 12, 1997	7,711.46
June 13, 1997	7,782.03
June 20, 1997	7,796.51
July 3, 1997	7,895.80
July 8, 1997	7,962.30
July 15, 1997	7,975.70
July 16, 1997	8,038.88
July 22, 1997	8,061.64
July 23, 1997	8,088.35
July 24, 1997	8,116.92
July 28, 1997	8,121.10
July 29, 1997	8,174.52
July 30, 1997	8,254.89
August 6, 1997	8,259.30

=== 1998 (30 record closes) ===
Date of Record	Closing Level
February 10, 1998	8,295.61
February 11, 1998	8,314.54
February 12, 1998	8,369.59
February 13, 1998	8,370.09
February 17, 1998	8,398.49
February 18, 1998	8,451.05
February 25, 1998	8,457.77
February 26, 1998	8,490.66
February 27, 1998	8,545.71
March 2, 1998	8,550.44
March 3, 1998	8,584.82
March 10, 1998	8,643.11
March 11, 1998	8,675.75
March 16, 1998	8,718.84
March 17, 1998	8,749.98
March 18, 1998	8,775.39
March 19, 1998	8,803.04
March 20, 1998	8,906.42
April 2, 1998	8,986.64
April 6, 1998	9,033.22
April 14, 1998	9,110.19
April 15, 1998	9,162.26
April 17, 1998	9,167.49
April 21, 1998	9,184.93
May 4, 1998	9,192.65
May 13, 1998	9,211.83
July 14, 1998	9,245.54
July 16, 1998	9,328.18
July 17, 1998	9,337.97
November 23, 1998	9,374.27

=== 1999 (35 record closes) ===
Date of Record	Closing Level
January 6, 1999	9,544.97
January 8, 1999	9,643.32
March 5, 1999	9,736.07
March 10, 1999	9,772.84
March 11, 1999	9,897.44
March 15, 1999	9,958.77
March 18, 1999	9,997.62
March 29, 1999	10,006.78
April 5, 1999	10,007.33
April 7, 1999	10,085.31
April 8, 1999	10,197.70
April 12, 1999	10,339.51
April 13, 1999	10,395.01
April 14, 1999	10,411.66
April 15, 1999	10,462.72
April 16, 1999	10,493.89
April 21, 1999	10,581.42
April 22, 1999	10,727.18
April 27, 1999	10,831.71
April 28, 1999	10,845.45
April 29, 1999	10,878.38
May 3, 1999	11,014.69
May 7, 1999	11,031.59
May 13, 1999	11,107.19
July 2, 1999	11,139.25
July 7, 1999	11,187.37
July 9, 1999	11,193.70
July 12, 1999	11,200.98
July 16, 1999	11,209.85
August 23, 1999	11,299.76
August 25, 1999	11,326.04
December 23, 1999	11,405.76
December 28, 1999	11,476.71
December 29, 1999	11,484.67
December 31, 1999	11,497.12

=== 2000 (4 record closes) ===
Date of Record	Closing Level
January 7, 2000	11,522.56
January 10, 2000	11,572.20
January 13, 2000	11,582.44
January 14, 2000	11,722.98

=== 2006 (22 record closes) ===
Date of Record	Closing Level
October 3, 2006	11,727.34
October 4, 2006	11,850.61
October 5, 2006	11,866.69
October 10, 2006	11,867.17
October 12, 2006	11,947.70
October 13, 2006	11,960.51
October 16, 2006	11,980.60
October 18, 2006	11,992.68
October 19, 2006	12,011.73
October 23, 2006	12,116.91
October 24, 2006	12,127.88
October 25, 2006	12,134.68
October 26, 2006	12,163.66
November 8, 2006	12,176.54
November 14, 2006	12,218.01
November 15, 2006	12,251.71
November 16, 2006	12,305.82
November 17, 2006	12,342.56
December 14, 2006	12,416.76
December 15, 2006	12,445.52
December 19, 2006	12,471.32
December 27, 2006	12,510.57

=== 2007 (34 record closes) ===
Date of Record	Closing Level
January 11, 2007	12,514.98
January 12, 2007	12,556.08
January 16, 2007	12,582.59
January 24, 2007	12,621.77
February 1, 2007	12,673.68
February 14, 2007	12,741.86
February 15, 2007	12,765.01
February 16, 2007	12,767.57
February 20, 2007	12,786.64
April 18, 2007	12,803.84
April 19, 2007	12,808.63
April 20, 2007	12,961.98
April 25, 2007	13,089.89
April 26, 2007	13,105.50
April 27, 2007	13,120.94
May 1, 2007	13,136.14
May 2, 2007	13,211.88
May 3, 2007	13,241.38
May 4, 2007	13,264.62
May 7, 2007	13,312.97
May 9, 2007	13,362.87
May 15, 2007	13,383.84
May 16, 2007	13,487.53
May 18, 2007	13,556.53
May 30, 2007	13,633.08
June 1, 2007	13,668.11
June 4, 2007	13,676.32
July 12, 2007	13,861.73
July 13, 2007	13,907.25
July 16, 2007	13,950.98
July 17, 2007	13,971.55
July 19, 2007	14,000.41
October 1, 2007	14,087.55
October 9, 2007	14,164.53

=== 2013 (52 record closes) ===
Date of Record	Closing Level
March 5, 2013	14,253.77
March 6, 2013	14,296.24
March 7, 2013	14,329.49
March 8, 2013	14,397.06
March 11, 2013	14,447.29
March 12, 2013	14,450.06
March 13, 2013	14,455.28
March 14, 2013	14,539.14
March 26, 2013	14,559.65
March 28, 2013	14,578.54
April 2, 2013	14,662.01
April 9, 2013	14,673.46
April 10, 2013	14,802.24
April 11, 2013	14,865.14
May 3, 2013	14,973.96
May 7, 2013	15,056.20
May 8, 2013	15,105.12
May 10, 2013	15,118.49
May 14, 2013	15,215.25
May 15, 2013	15,275.69
May 17, 2013	15,354.40
May 21, 2013	15,387.58
May 28, 2013	15,409.39
July 11, 2013	15,460.92
July 12, 2013	15,464.30
July 15, 2013	15,484.26
July 18, 2013	15,548.54
July 23, 2013	15,567.74
August 1, 2013	15,628.02
August 2, 2013	15,658.36
September 18, 2013	15,676.94
October 29, 2013	15,680.35
November 6, 2013	15,746.88
November 8, 2013	15,761.78
November 11, 2013	15,783.10
November 13, 2013	15,821.63
November 14, 2013	15,876.22
November 15, 2013	15,961.70
November 18, 2013	15,976.02
November 21, 2013	16,009.99
November 22, 2013	16,064.77
November 25, 2013	16,072.54
November 26, 2013	16,072.80
November 27, 2013	16,097.33
December 18, 2013	16,167.97
December 19, 2013	16,179.08
December 20, 2013	16,221.14
December 23, 2013	16,294.61
December 24, 2013	16,357.55
December 26, 2013	16,479.88
December 30, 2013	16,504.29
December 31, 2013	16,576.66

=== 2014 (38 record closes) ===
Date of Record	Closing Level
April 30, 2014	16,580.84
May 9, 2014	16,583.34
May 12, 2014	16,695.47
May 13, 2014	16,715.44
May 30, 2014	16,717.17
June 2, 2014	16,743.63
June 5, 2014	16,836.11
June 6, 2014	16,924.28
June 9, 2014	16,943.10
June 10, 2014	16,945.92
June 20, 2014	16,947.08
July 1, 2014	16,956.07
July 2, 2014	16,976.24
July 3, 2014	17,068.26
July 16, 2014	17,138.20
September 17, 2014	17,156.85
September 18, 2014	17,265.99
September 19, 2014	17,279.74
October 31, 2014	17,390.52
November 5, 2014	17,484.53
November 6, 2014	17,554.47
November 7, 2014	17,573.93
November 10, 2014	17,613.74
November 11, 2014	17,614.90
November 13, 2014	17,652.79
November 18, 2014	17,687.82
November 20, 2014	17,719.00
November 21, 2014	17,810.06
November 24, 2014	17,817.90
November 26, 2014	17,827.75
November 28, 2014	17,828.24
December 2, 2014	17,879.55
December 3, 2014	17,912.62
December 5, 2014	17,958.79
December 22, 2014	17,959.44
December 23, 2014	18,024.17
December 24, 2014	18,030.21
December 26, 2014	18,053.71

=== 2015 (6 record closes) ===
Date of Record	Closing Level
February 20, 2015	18,140.44
February 24, 2015	18,209.19
February 25, 2015	18,224.57
March 2, 2015	18,288.63
May 18, 2015	18,298.88
May 19, 2015	18,312.39

=== 2016 (26 record closes) ===
Date of Record	Closing Level
July 12, 2016	18,347.67
July 13, 2016	18,372.12
July 14, 2016	18,506.41
July 15, 2016	18,516.55
July 18, 2016	18,533.05
July 19, 2016	18,559.01
July 20, 2016	18,595.03
August 11, 2016	18,613.52
August 15, 2016	18,636.05
November 10, 2016	18,807.88
November 11, 2016	18,847.66
November 14, 2016	18,868.69
November 15, 2016	18,923.06
November 21, 2016	18,956.69
November 22, 2016	19,023.87
November 23, 2016	19,083.18
November 25, 2016	19,152.14
December 1, 2016	19,191.93
December 5, 2016	19,216.24
December 6, 2016	19,251.78
December 7, 2016	19,549.62
December 8, 2016	19,614.81
December 9, 2016	19,756.85
December 12, 2016	19,796.43
December 13, 2016	19,911.21
December 20, 2016	19,974.62

=== 2017 (71 record closes) ===
Date of Record	Closing Level
January 25, 2017	20,068.51
January 26, 2017	20,100.91
February 9, 2017	20,172.40
February 10, 2017	20,269.37
February 13, 2017	20,412.16
February 14, 2017	20,504.41
February 15, 2017	20,611.86
February 16, 2017	20,619.77
February 17, 2017	20,624.05
February 21, 2017	20,743.00
February 22, 2017	20,775.60
February 23, 2017	20,810.32
February 24, 2017	20,821.76
February 27, 2017	20,837.44
March 1, 2017	21,115.55
June 1, 2017	21,144.18
June 2, 2017	21,206.29
June 9, 2017	21,271.97
June 13, 2017	21,328.47
June 14, 2017	21,374.56
June 16, 2017	21,384.28
June 19, 2017	21,528.99
July 12, 2017	21,532.14
July 13, 2017	21,553.09
July 14, 2017	21,637.74
July 19, 2017	21,640.75
July 26, 2017	21,711.01
July 27, 2017	21,796.55
July 28, 2017	21,830.31
July 31, 2017	21,891.12
August 1, 2017	21,963.92
August 2, 2017	22,016.24
August 3, 2017	22,026.10
August 4, 2017	22,092.81
August 7, 2017	22,118.42
September 12, 2017	22,118.86
September 13, 2017	22,158.18
September 14, 2017	22,203.48
September 15, 2017	22,268.34
September 18, 2017	22,331.35
September 19, 2017	22,370.80
September 20, 2017	22,412.59
October 2, 2017	22,557.60
October 3, 2017	22,641.67
October 4, 2017	22,661.64
October 5, 2017	22,775.39
October 10, 2017	22,830.68
October 11, 2017	22,872.89
October 16, 2017	22,956.96
October 17, 2017	22,997.44
October 18, 2017	23,157.60
October 19, 2017	23,163.04
October 20, 2017	23,328.63
October 24, 2017	23,441.76
November 2, 2017	23,516.26
November 3, 2017	23,539.19
November 6, 2017	23,548.42
November 7, 2017	23,557.23
November 8, 2017	23,563.36
November 21, 2017	23,590.83
November 28, 2017	23,836.71
November 29, 2017	23,940.68
November 30, 2017	24,272.35
December 4, 2017	24,290.05
December 8, 2017	24,329.16
December 11, 2017	24,386.03
December 12, 2017	24,504.80
December 13, 2017	24,585.43
December 15, 2017	24,651.74
December 18, 2017	24,792.20
December 28, 2017	24,837.51

=== 2018 (15 record closes) ===
Date of Record	Closing Level
January 3, 2018	24,922.68
January 4, 2018	25,075.13
January 5, 2018	25,295.87
January 9, 2018	25,385.80
January 11, 2018	25,574.73
January 12, 2018	25,803.19
January 17, 2018	26,115.65
January 22, 2018	26,214.60
January 24, 2018	26,252.12
January 25, 2018	26,392.79
January 26, 2018	26,616.71
September 20, 2018	26,656.98
September 21, 2018	26,743.50
October 2, 2018	26,773.94
October 3, 2018	26,828.39

=== 2019 (22 record closes) ===
Date of Record	Closing Level
July 3, 2019	26,966.00
July 11, 2019	27,088.08
July 12, 2019	27,332.03
July 15, 2019	27,359.16
November 4, 2019	27,462.11
November 5, 2019	27,492.63
November 7, 2019	27,674.80
November 8, 2019	27,681.24
November 11, 2019	27,691.49
November 13, 2019	27,783.59
November 15, 2019	28,004.89
November 18, 2019	28,036.22
November 25, 2019	28,066.47
November 26, 2019	28,121.68
November 27, 2019	28,164.00
December 16, 2019	28,235.89
December 17, 2019	28,267.16
December 19, 2019	28,376.96
December 20, 2019	28,455.09
December 23, 2019	28,551.53
December 26, 2019	28,621.39
December 27, 2019	28,645.26

=== 2020 (14 record closes) ===
Date of Record	Closing Level
January 2, 2020	28,868.80
January 9, 2020	28,956.90
January 15, 2020	29,030.22
January 16, 2020	29,297.64
January 17, 2020	29,348.10
February 6, 2020	29,379.77
February 12, 2020	29,551.42
November 16, 2020	29,950.44
November 24, 2020	30,046.24
December 4, 2020	30,218.26
December 17, 2020	30,303.37
December 28, 2020	30,403.97
December 30, 2020	30,409.56
December 31, 2020	30,606.48

=== 2021 (45 record closes) ===
Date of Record	Closing Level
January 6, 2021	30,829.40
January 7, 2021	31,041.13
January 8, 2021	31,097.97
January 20, 2021	31,188.38
February 8, 2021	31,385.76
February 10, 2021	31,437.80
February 12, 2021	31,458.40
February 16, 2021	31,522.75
February 17, 2021	31,613.02
February 24, 2021	31,961.86
March 10, 2021	32,297.02
March 11, 2021	32,485.59
March 12, 2021	32,778.64
March 15, 2021	32,953.46
March 17, 2021	33,015.37
March 26, 2021	33,072.88
March 29, 2021	33,171.37
April 5, 2021	33,527.19
April 9, 2021	33,800.60
April 15, 2021	34,035.99
April 16, 2021	34,200.67
May 5, 2021	34,230.64
May 6, 2021	34,548.53
May 7, 2021	34,777.76
July 2, 2021	34,786.35
July 9, 2021	34,870.16
July 12, 2021	34,996.18
July 23, 2021	35,061.55
July 26, 2021	35,144.31
August 6, 2021	35,208.51
August 10, 2021	35,264.67
August 11, 2021	35,484.97
August 12, 2021	35,499.85
August 13, 2021	35,515.38
August 16, 2021	35,625.40
October 22, 2021	35,677.02
October 25, 2021	35,741.15
October 26, 2021	35,756.88
October 29, 2021	35,819.56
November 1, 2021	35,913.84
November 2, 2021	36,052.63
November 3, 2021	36,157.58
November 5, 2021	36,327.95
November 8, 2021	36,432.22
December 29, 2021	36,488.63

=== 2022 (2 record closes) ===
Date of Record	Closing Level
January 3, 2022	36,585.06
January 4, 2022	36,799.65

=== 2023 (7 record closes) ===
Date of Record	Closing Level
December 13, 2023	37,090.24
December 14, 2023	37,248.35
December 15, 2023	37,305.16
December 18, 2023	37,306.02
December 19, 2023	37,557.92
December 27, 2023	37,656.52
December 28, 2023	37,710.10

=== 2024 (48 record closes) ===
Date of Record	Closing Level
January 2, 2024	37,715.04
January 19, 2024	37,863.80
January 22, 2024	38,001.81
January 25, 2024	38,049.13
January 26, 2024	38,109.43
January 29, 2024	38,333.45
January 30, 2024	38,467.31
February 1, 2024	38,519.84
February 2, 2024	38,654.42
February 7, 2024	38,677.36
February 8, 2024	38,726.33
February 12, 2024	38,797.38
February 22, 2024	39,069.11
February 23, 2024	39,131.53
March 20, 2024	39,512.13
March 21, 2024	39,781.37
March 28, 2024	39,807.37
May 15, 2024	39,908.00
May 17, 2024	40,003.59
July 15, 2024	40,211.72
July 16, 2024	40,954.48
July 17, 2024	41,198.08
August 26, 2024	41,240.52
August 27, 2024	41,250.50
August 29, 2024	41,335.05
August 30, 2024	41,563.08
September 16, 2024	41,622.08
September 19, 2024	42,025.19
September 20, 2024	42,063.36
September 23, 2024	42,124.65
September 24, 2024	42,208.22
September 27, 2024	42,313.00
September 30, 2024	42,330.15
October 4, 2024	42,352.75
October 9, 2024	42,512.00
October 11, 2024	42,863.86
October 14, 2024	43,065.22
October 16, 2024	43,077.70
October 17, 2024	43,239.05
October 18, 2024	43,275.91
November 6, 2024	43,729.93
November 8, 2024	43,988.99
November 11, 2024	44,293.13
November 22, 2024	44,296.51
November 25, 2024	44,736.57
November 26, 2024	44,860.31
November 29, 2024	44,910.65
December 4, 2024	45,014.04

=== 2025 (19 record closes) ===
Date of Record	Closing Level
August 22, 2025	45,631.74
August 28, 2025	45,636.90
September 9, 2025	45,711.56
September 11, 2025	46,108.00
September 18, 2025	46,142.33
September 19, 2025	46,315.27
September 22, 2025	46,381.54
September 30, 2025	46,397.89
October 1, 2025	46,441.10
October 2, 2025	46,519.72
October 3, 2025	46,758.28
October 21, 2025	46,924.74
October 24, 2025	47,207.12
October 27, 2025	47,544.59
October 28, 2025	47,706.37
November 11, 2025	47,927.96
November 12, 2025	48,254.82
December 11, 2025	48,704.01
December 24, 2025	48,731.16

=== 2026 (24 record closes) ===
Date of Record	Closing Level
January 5, 2026	48,977.18
January 6, 2026	49,462.08
January 9, 2026	49,504.07
January 12, 2026	49,590.20
February 6, 2026	50,115.67
February 9, 2026	50,135.87
February 10, 2026	50,188.14
May 21, 2026	50,285.66
May 22, 2026	50,579.70
May 27, 2026	50,644.28
May 28, 2026	50,668.97
May 29, 2026	51,032.46
June 1, 2026	51,078.88
June 2, 2026	51,307.79
June 4, 2026	51,561.93
June 15, 2026	51,671.03
June 16, 2026	51,999.67
June 29, 2026	52,182.74
June 30, 2026	52,319.20
July 2, 2026	52,900.07
July 6, 2026	53,055.91
August 3, 2026	53,178.41
August 4, 2026	54,085.88
August 5, 2026	54,349.12

== List of 1,000-point milestones by number of trading days ==
Milestone	Date of Record	Trading Days
1,000	November 14, 1972	20,151
2,000	January 8, 1987	3,574
3,000	April 17, 1991	1,080
4,000	February 23, 1995	975
5,000	November 21, 1995	189
6,000	October 14, 1996	226
7,000	February 13, 1997	85
8,000	July 16, 1997	105
9,000	April 6, 1998	182
10,000	March 29, 1999	246
11,000	May 3, 1999	24
12,000	October 19, 2006	1,879
13,000	April 25, 2007	127
14,000	July 19, 2007	59
15,000	May 7, 2013	1,460
16,000	November 21, 2013	139
17,000	July 3, 2014	153
18,000	December 23, 2014	120
19,000	November 22, 2016	483
20,000	January 25, 2017	42
21,000	March 1, 2017	24
22,000	August 2, 2017	107
23,000	October 18, 2017	54
24,000	November 30, 2017	30
25,000	January 4, 2018	23
26,000	January 17, 2018	8
27,000	July 11, 2019	372
28,000	November 15, 2019	90
29,000	January 15, 2020	40
30,000	November 24, 2020	218
31,000	January 7, 2021	29
32,000	March 10, 2021	42
33,000	March 17, 2021	5
34,000	April 15, 2021	20
35,000	July 23, 2021	69
36,000	November 2, 2021	71
37,000	December 13, 2023	531
38,000	January 22, 2024	25
39,000	February 22, 2024	22
40,000	May 17, 2024	60
41,000	July 17, 2024	40
42,000	September 19, 2024	45
43,000	October 14, 2024	17
44,000	November 11, 2024	20
45,000	December 4, 2024	16
46,000	September 11, 2025	191
47,000	October 24, 2025	31
48,000	November 12, 2025	13
49,000	January 6, 2026	36
50,000	February 6, 2026	22
51,000	May 29, 2026	77
52,000	June 29, 2026	20
53,000	July 6, 2026	4
54,000	August 4, 2026	21

== List of 10,000-point milestones by number of trading days ==
Milestone	Date of Record	Trading Days
10,000	March 29, 1999	26,813
20,000	January 25, 2017	4,486
30,000	November 24, 2020	966
40,000	May 17, 2024	874
50,000	February 6, 2026	431

== See also ==
- Closing milestones of the Nasdaq Composite
- Closing milestones of the S&P 500
- List of largest daily changes in the Dow Jones Industrial Average
- Market trend
- Stock market bubble
- Stock market crash
- Wilshire 5000
- Dow Jones Industrial Average
