= Closing milestones of the S&P 500 =

This article is a summary of the closing milestones of the S&P 500 Index, a United States stock market index.

== Price history & milestones ==
Launched by the Standard Statistics Company in 1926 as the successor to its 1923 233-stock weekly index, the Composite Stock Index was a daily 90-stock index that preceded the S&P 500. Following continual daily closure records from 17.66 in December 1927 to 31.71 in August 1929, the Wall Street crash of 1929 began a trend of daily closure losses in which the index fell to a record low of 4.43 by June 1932. While the index saw a degree of recovery in subsequent years, closing at 18.09 in February 1937, it did not surpass its pre-Great Depression record until its closure at 32.31 in September 1954.

In March 1957 the index was expanded to its current 500-stock structure and renamed the S&P 500 Stock Composite Index. Subsequently, closing beyond 50 for the first time in September 1958, the continued post-World War II boom in the United States resulted in the index nearly doubling to a closing price of 94.06 on February 9, 1966. The subsequent 1970s bear market and early 1980s bull depression slowed growth of the index for over a decade. As a result of the mid-1980s bull market, the index tripled from 102.42 on August 12, 1982, to 336.77 on August 25, 1987. The subsequent stock market crash on October 19, 1987 (Black Monday) saw the index lose 20.47% of its value, its highest daily percentage loss to date. Falling to 230.30 by November 1987, the index took until July 26, 1989, to recover to its pre-crash high of 336.77.

Closing above 500 for the first time on March 24, 1995, the dot-com bubble of the late 1990s fueled increased market growth through the turn of the millennium, with the S&P 500 surpassing 800 on February 12, 1997, and 1,000 on February 2, 1998, with an intraday high of 1,552.87 on March 24, 2000. As a result of the 2002 stock market downturn, the index fell to 768.83 by October 10, 2002, and took until October 11, 2007, to surpass its March 2000 intraday trading high. While a brief bull market in 2007 led to the index achieving new record closures of 1,530.23 on May 30 through to 1,565.15 on October 9, the bursting of the 2000s United States housing bubble led to the subprime mortgage crisis, the 2008 financial crisis, and the Great Recession. These events, including the bankruptcy of Lehman Brothers, caused substantial market volatility that resulted in the S&P 500 closing up or down 3 percent or more 29 times in the fourth quarter of 2008. This included an increase of 11.6% on October 13, 2008, the index's highest daily percentage gain to date.

In the year since its record closure of 1,565.15 in October 2007, the index fell by over 50% to 752.44 on November 20, 2008, its lowest point since March 1997. Closing the year at 903.25—a yearly loss of 38.5%—the index continued to decline in the first quarter of 2009, with the 2007–2009 bear market reaching a trough of 666 on March 6, 2009. The drawdown from the high in October 2007 to the low in March 2009 was 56.8%, the largest since World War II. Despite this, the index recovered substantially in the following year, closing at 822.92 on March 23, 2009, and at 1,115.10 by the end of the year, making 2009 the index's second-best year of the decade. On April 14, 2010, the index closed at 1,210.65, its first close above 1,200 since August 2008.

The index subsequently experienced a degree of volatility, falling to 1,022.58 by July 2, 2010, rising to 1,363.61 by April 29, 2011, and falling again below 1,100 by October 4, 2011, the latter due to the August 2011 stock markets fall. While this period of volatility continued into 2012 amid electoral and fiscal uncertainty and round 3 of quantitative easing, the index closed the year at 1,426.19, an annual gain of 13% and its biggest gain in 3 years. On March 28 and April 10, 2013, the index's October 2007 closing and intraday trading highs, respectively, were surpassed for the first time, recovering all losses incurred during the Great Recession. The index surpassed 2,000 for the first time on August 26, 2014, reaching an all-time closing high of 2,130.82 on May 21, 2015. It was not surpassed until July 11, 2016, due to a market decline precipitated by the 2015–2016 stock market selloff and 2015–2016 Chinese stock market turbulence. The index surpassed 2,500 on September 25, 2017, finishing the year up 19.4%, its best since 2013.

The index rose for the tenth month running in January 2018, falling 4% the next month in part due to the doubling of market volatility on February 5. Following a strong third quarter and a weak fourth quarter, the year ended with the index declining by 6%, its worst year in a decade. High market growth in the next two quarters reversed the prior year's losses by April 2019, with the index surpassing 3,000 on July 10. The index closed the year with a growth rate of 28.9%, among its best to date. While the index reached a new closing peak of 3,386.15 on February 19, 2020, the onset of the COVID-19 pandemic and recession saw it lose 10% of its value in the next six trading days, its fastest drop from a new peak to date. At the trough of the 2020 stock market crash on March 23, 2020, the index had fallen 34% from its February peak. While the index fell by 20% by the end of the first quarter, its worst since 2008, it realized a 20% gain in the second quarter, its best since 1998. The index reached a new record high of 3,756.07 by the end of the year, closing above 4,000 for the first time on April 1, 2021. By the end of the year the index closed 70 of the year's 252 trading days at new record closing prices, the second highest to date behind the 77 recorded in 1995. 2021 also marked the first year since 2005 when the S&P 500 beat the other two closely watched U.S. stock indices: the Dow Jones Industrial Average and the Nasdaq Composite.

== History ==
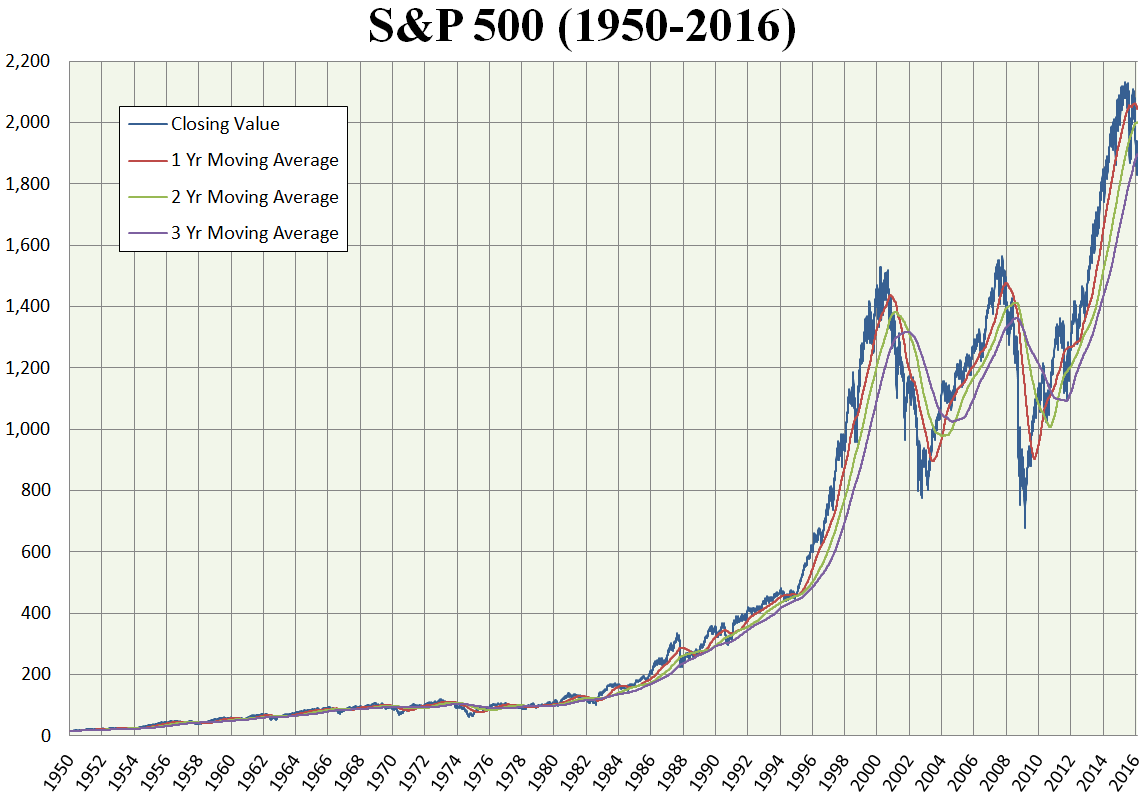
S&P 500 Index from 1950 to 2016

Standard & Poor's, initially known as the Standard Statistics Company, created its first stock market index in 1923. It consisted of 233 different stocks and was computed on a weekly basis. Three years later, it developed a 90 component composite price index that was computed on a daily basis; that was expanded over the years. On March 4, 1957, the Standard & Poor's 500 (.INX) (.SPX) was introduced.

=== Milestone highs ===
- February 2, 1998: The S&P 500 index reaches 1,000 points, closing at 1001.27.
- March 24, 2000: The S&P 500 index reaches an all-time intraday high of 1552.87 during the dot-com bubble. It hit this level again on July 13, 2007.
- October 9, 2007: The index closes at a record high of 1565.15, the highest prior to the 2008 financial crisis. Two days later, the index hit an intraday record high of 1576.09. It did not regain this closing level until April 10, 2013.
- August 26, 2014: The S&P 500 index reaches 2,000 points, closing at 2,000.02.
- July 12, 2019: The S&P 500 index reaches 3,000 points, closing at 3,013.77.
- February 19, 2020: The S&P 500 index reached its highest point in the bull market that started from the low point on March 9, 2009, closing at 3386.15.
- August 18, 2020: The S&P 500 index closed at a record high of 3389.78 amid the ongoing COVID-19 pandemic in the United States.
- April 1, 2021: The S&P 500 index reaches 4,000 points, closing at 4,019.87.
- February 9, 2024: The S&P 500 index reaches 5,000 points, closing at 5,026.61.
- November 11, 2024: The S&P 500 index reaches 6,000 points, closing at 6,001.35.
- April 15, 2026: The S&P 500 index reaches 7,000 points, closing at 7,022.95.

=== Milestone lows ===
- March 9, 2009: S&P 500 closed at 676.53 (it hit a 666.79 intraday low on March 6), its closing low after the onset of the 2008 financial crisis and the bankruptcy of Lehman Brothers.

=== Milestone changes ===
- October 19, 1987: S&P 500 registers its largest daily percentage loss, falling 20.47 percent. The one-day crash, known as "Black Monday", was blamed on program trading and those using a hedging strategy known as portfolio insurance. Despite the losses, the S&P 500 still closed positive for the year.
- February 5, 2018: After months of low volatility, S&P 500 registers a new largest daily point loss of 113.19 points, equivalent to more than 4%. Three days later, the index suffered another heavy loss of nearly the same amount.
- October 13, 2008: S&P 500 marks its best daily percentage gain, rising 11.58 percent. It also registers its then-largest single-day point increase of 104.13 points.
- December 26, 2018: While on pace for the worst December performance since the Great Depression, S&P 500 registers a new largest daily point gain of 116.60 points, which translates to roughly 5% on the index.
- December 31, 2008: For the year, S&P 500 falls 38.49 percent, its worst yearly percentage loss. In September 2008, Lehman Brothers collapsed as the 2008 financial crisis spread.
- March 16, 2020: The S&P 500 index suffered its worst daily decline since 1987's Black Monday, falling 9.5 percent, as a result of anxiety about the coronavirus pandemic. The decline of more than 20% since its peak, only 16 trading days earlier, signaled the start of a bear market closing at 2,480.64.
- June 8, 2023: The S&P 500 advanced 26.41 points, or 0.6%, to end at 4,293.93 Thursday, its highest closing level since Aug. 16, 2022, according to Dow Jones Market Data. The 4,292.44 level marked a 20% rally off the bear-market closing low of 3,577.03 set on Oct. 12, 2022. By closing above that threshold, the S&P met a widely used definition of the end of a bear market.

== Records ==
=== Price index ===
Category	All-time highs		All-time lows	
Closing	7,818.93	Tuesday, October 6, 2026	16.66	Tuesday, January 3, 1950
Intraday	7,844.52	Tuesday, October 6, 2026	16.66	Tuesday, January 3, 1950

=== Total return index ===
The total return index takes dividends into account.

Category	All-time highs	
Closing	17,539.28	Tuesday, October 6, 2026
Intraday	17,596.69	Tuesday, October 6, 2026

== Incremental closing milestones ==
The following is a list of the milestone closing levels of the S&P 500. 1-point increments are used up to the 20-point level; 2 to 50; 5 to 100; 10 to 500; 20 to 1,000; 50 to 3,000; and 100-point increments thereafter. Bold formatting is applied to every five milestones, excluding peaks.

=== The Post-World War II Boom (1949–1966) ===
Milestone	Closing level	Date first achieved
16.66 (Note: This was the S&P 500's very first close on January 3, 1950.)	16.66	January 3, 1950
17	17.08	January 9, 1950
18	18.03	April 18, 1950
19	19.14	June 8, 1950
20	20.00	October 4, 1950
22	22.20	February 5, 1951
24	24.16	January 14, 1952
26	26.04	December 12, 1952
28	28.18	April 29, 1954
30	30.14	July 9, 1954
32	32.00	September 22, 1954
34	34.03	November 23, 1954
36	36.75	January 3, 1955
38	38.27	April 18, 1955
40	40.10	June 17, 1955
42	43.18	July 6, 1955
44	44.19	September 12, 1955
46	46.41	November 14, 1955
48	48.14	March 16, 1956
50	50.06	September 30, 1958
55	55.21	December 31, 1958
60	60.01	July 7, 1959
65	65.06	March 30, 1961
70	70.01	November 6, 1961
75	75.02	December 31, 1963
80	80.02	April 6, 1964
85	85.04	October 8, 1964
90	90.27	May 13, 1965

=== The 1970s Bear Market (1967–1973) ===
Milestone	Closing level	Date first achieved
94.06 (Note: This was the S&P 500's close at the peak on February 9, 1966.)	94.32	May 4, 1967
95	95.37	August 1, 1967
100	100.38	June 4, 1968
110	110.18	April 12, 1972
120	120.24	January 11, 1973

=== The Early 1980s Bull Depression (1980–1982) ===
Milestone	Closing level	Date first achieved
120.24 (Note: This was the S&P 500's close at the peak on January 11, 1973 before the 1973–74 stock market crash.)	121.44	July 17, 1980
130	130.40	September 22, 1980
140	140.40	November 20, 1980

=== The Mid-1980s Bull Market (1982–1987) ===
Milestone	Closing level	Date first achieved
140.52 (Note: This was the S&P 500's close at the peak on November 28, 1980.)	142.87	November 3, 1982
150	150.88	March 1, 1983
160	160.71	April 20, 1983
170	170.53	June 21, 1983
180	180.35	February 4, 1985
190	190.04	June 4, 1985
200	201.41	November 21, 1985
210	212.02	December 16, 1985
220	222.45	February 18, 1986
230	231.69	March 11, 1986
240	242.22	April 16, 1986
250	250.84	June 30, 1986
260	260.30	January 12, 1987
270	273.91	January 22, 1987
280	281.16	February 5, 1987
290	290.52	March 5, 1987
300	301.16	March 23, 1987
310	310.68	July 14, 1987
320	322.09	August 6, 1987
330	333.99	August 14, 1987

=== The 1990s Technology Bubble (1989–2000) ===
Milestone	Closing level	Date first achieved
336.77 (Note: This was the S&P 500's close at the peak on August 25, 1987 before Black Monday.)	338.05	July 26, 1989
340	341.99	July 27, 1989
350	351.52	August 24, 1989
360	360.65	May 29, 1990
370	370.47	March 1, 1991
380	380.40	April 12, 1991
390	390.45	April 17, 1991
400	404.84	December 26, 1991
410	415.14	December 30, 1991
420	420.44	January 14, 1992
430	430.16	November 27, 1992
440	441.28	December 18, 1992
450	454.71	March 8, 1993
460	460.13	August 25, 1993
470	470.54	December 27, 1993
480	481.61	January 31, 1994
490	490.05	March 13, 1995
500	500.97	March 24, 1995
520	520.48	May 3, 1995
540	545.22	June 19, 1995
560	560.89	July 12, 1995
580	583.61	September 14, 1995
600	600.07	November 17, 1995
620	620.18	December 6, 1995
640	641.43	February 5, 1996
660	661.45	February 12, 1996
680	680.54	September 13, 1996
700	701.46	October 4, 1996
720	724.59	November 6, 1996
740	742.16	November 19, 1996
760	768.86	January 14, 1997
780	782.72	January 21, 1997
800	802.77	February 12, 1997
820	830.29	May 5, 1997
840	841.88	May 15, 1997
860	862.91	June 9, 1997
880	883.46	June 12, 1997
900	904.03	July 2, 1997
920	925.76	July 15, 1997
940	940.30	July 24, 1997
960	960.32	August 6, 1997
980	983.12	October 7, 1997
1,000	1,001.27	February 2, 1998
1,050	1,052.02	March 3, 1998
1,100	1,105.65	March 24, 1998
1,150	1,157.33	July 6, 1998
1,200	1,202.84	December 21, 1998
1,250	1,272.34	January 6, 1999
1,300	1,307.26	March 15, 1999
1,350	1,358.63	April 12, 1999
1,400	1,403.28	July 9, 1999
1,450	1,458.34	December 23, 1999
1,500	1,500.64	March 22, 2000

=== The Mid-2000s Cyclical Bull Market (2007) ===
Milestone	Closing level	Date first achieved
1,527.46 (Note: This was the S&P 500's close at the peak on March 24, 2000 before the dot-com crash.)	1,530.23	May 30, 2007
1,550	1,552.50	July 13, 2007

=== The Mid-2010s Bull Market (2013–2020) ===
Milestone	Closing level	Date first achieved
1,565.15 (Note: This was the S&P 500's close at the peak on October 9, 2007 before the 2008 financial crisis.)	1,569.19	March 28, 2013
1,600	1,614.42	May 3, 2013
1,650	1,650.34	May 14, 2013
1,700	1,706.87	August 1, 2013
1,750	1,754.67	October 22, 2013
1,800	1,804.76	November 22, 2013
1,850	1,854.29	February 27, 2014
1,900	1,900.53	May 23, 2014
1,950	1,951.27	June 9, 2014
2,000	2,000.02	August 26, 2014
2,050	2,051.80	November 18, 2014
2,100	2,100.34	February 17, 2015
2,130.82 (Note: This was the S&P 500's close at the peak on May 21, 2015 before the 2015-16 stock market selloff.)	2,137.16	July 11, 2016
2,150	2,152.14	July 12, 2016
2,200	2,202.94	November 22, 2016
2,250	2,259.53	December 9, 2016
2,300 (Note: The S&P first crossed 2,300 during the day on January 26, 2017 before falling below the level at closing. After that, the S&P retreated away from the 2,300-pt milestone for a possible selloff in the next month. It took two weeks for the S&P to finally close above 2,300.)	2,307.87	February 9, 2017
2,350	2,351.16	February 17, 2017
2,400 (Note: The S&P first crossed 2,400 during the day on March 1, 2017 before falling below the level at closing. After that, the S&P retreated away from the 2,400-pt milestone and then closed within 1 point of the milestone on May 5, 2017. Then on May 8, 2017, the S&P traded above 2,400 intraday then closed below that milestone again and did it the third time the very next day. However, it took until May 15, 2017 for the S&P to finally close above 2,400.)	2,402.32	May 15, 2017
2,450	2,453.46	June 19, 2017
2,500	2,500.23	September 15, 2017
2,550	2,552.07	October 5, 2017
2,600	2,602.42	November 24, 2017
2,650	2,651.50	December 8, 2017
2,700	2,713.06	January 3, 2018
2,750	2,751.29	January 9, 2018
2,800	2,802.56	January 17, 2018
2,850	2,872.87	January 26, 2018
2,900	2,914.04	August 29, 2018
2,930.75 (Note: This was the S&P 500's close at the peak on September 20, 2018 prior to the rapid selloff within the last quarter of the same year. While a 20% decline was recognized on an intraday-basis, the threshold was not met on a closing-basis, leading some to call it a correction and others a bear market.)	2,933.68	April 23, 2019
2,950	2,954.18	June 20, 2019
3,000	3,013.77	July 12, 2019
3,100	3,120.46	November 15, 2019
3,200	3,205.37	December 19, 2019
3,300	3,316.81	January 16, 2020

=== Bull Recession of 2020–21 ===
Milestone	Closing Level	Date First Achieved
3,386.15 (Note: After peaking on February 19, 2020, the S&P 500 Index rapidly fell into correction later that same month and into bear market territory in the next month amid the COVID-19 pandemic.)	3,389.78	August 18, 2020
3,400	3,431.30	August 24, 2020
3,500	3,508.01	August 28, 2020
3,600	3,626.91	November 16, 2020
3,700	3,702.25	December 8, 2020
3,800	3,803.79	January 7, 2021
3,900	3,915.59	February 8, 2021
4,000	4,019.87	April 1, 2021
4,100	4,128.80	April 9, 2021
4,200	4,211.47	April 29, 2021
4,300	4,319.94	July 1, 2021
4,400	4,411.79	July 23, 2021
4,500	4,509.37	August 27, 2021
4,600	4,605.38	October 29, 2021
4,700	4,701.70	November 8, 2021

=== The Current Bull Market (2022–present) ===
Milestone	Closing level	Date first achieved
4,800	4,839.81	January 19, 2024
4,900	4,927.93	January 29, 2024
5,000	5,026.61	February 9, 2024
5,100	5,137.08	March 1, 2024
5,200	5,224.62	March 20, 2024
5,300	5,308.15	May 15, 2024
5,400	5,421.03	June 12, 2024
5,500	5,509.01	July 2, 2024
5,600	5,633.91	July 10, 2024
5,700	5,713.64	September 19, 2024
5,800	5,815.03	October 11, 2024
5,900	5,929.04	November 6, 2024
6,000	6,001.35	November 11, 2024
6,100	6,118.71	January 23, 2025
6,200	6,204.95	June 30, 2025
6,300	6,305.60	July 21, 2025
6,400	6,445.76	August 12, 2025
6,500	6,501.86	August 28, 2025
6,600	6,615.28	September 15, 2025
6,700	6,711.20	October 1, 2025
6,800	6,875.16	October 27, 2025
6,900	6,901.00	December 11, 2025
7,000	7,022.95	April 15, 2026
7,100	7,126.06	April 17, 2026
7,200	7,209.01	April 30, 2026
7,300	7,365.12	May 6, 2026
7,400	7,412.84	May 11, 2026
7,500	7,501.24	May 14, 2026
7,600	7,609.78	June 2, 2026
7,700	7,736.52	August 4, 2026
7,800	7,818.93	October 6, 2026

== List of 1000-point milestones by number of trading days ==
Milestone (closing)	Date of Record	Trading Days
1,000	February 2, 1998	10,303 (Note: From March 4, 1957.)
2,000	August 26, 2014	4,168
3,000	July 12, 2019	1,227
4,000	April 1, 2021	434
5,000	February 9, 2024	719
6,000	November 11, 2024	190
7,000	April 15, 2026	355

== See also ==
- Closing milestones of the Dow Jones Industrial Average
- Closing milestones of the Nasdaq Composite
- List of largest daily changes in the S&P 500 Index
- Nasdaq-100#Record values
- Russell 3000 Index § Record values
- Wilshire 5000 § Record high values
