= List of stock market crashes and bear markets =

This is a list of stock market crashes and bear markets. The difference between the two lies in the rate of decline and timeframe over which they occur. Stock market crashes are quick and brief, while bear markets are slow and prolonged. The two do not necessarily happen in conjunction.

== Table ==
Name	Date	Country	Notes	Ref
Tulip mania Bubble	1637	Dutch Republic	A bubble (1633–37) in the Dutch Republic, during which contracts for bulbs of tulips reached extraordinarily high prices, and suddenly collapsed.	
The Mississippi Bubble	1720	Kingdom of France	Banque Royale by John Law stopped payments of its note, in exchange for specie and, as result, caused economic collapse in France.	
South Sea Bubble of 1720	1720	Great Britain	Affected early European stock markets, during early days of chartered joint stock companies.	
The Dutch Bubble of 1720	1720	Dutch Republic	A speculative mania in the Dutch Republic fueled by an influx of foreign capital, the rapid creation of new joint-stock companies and extensive Windhandel—unregulated options and forward contracts.	
Bengal Bubble of 1769	1769	Great Britain	Primarily caused by the British East India Company, whose shares fell from £276 in December 1768 to £122 in 1784.	
Crisis of 1772	1772	Great Britain; British America		
Financial Crisis of 1791–92	1791	United States	Shares of First bank of US boom and bust in Aug and Sept 1791. Groundwork of Alexander Hamilton's cooperation with the Bank of New York to end this event would be crucial in ending the Panic of 1792 (next year).	
Panic of 1796–1797	1796	Great Britain; United States	A series of downturns in Atlantic credit markets led to broader commercial downturns in Great Britain and the United States.	
Panic of 1819	1819	United States		
Panic of 1825	1825	United Kingdom		
Panic of 1837	10 May 1837	United States		
Panic of 1847	1847	United Kingdom		
Panic of 1857	1857	United States		
Panic of 1866	1866	United Kingdom		
Black Friday	24 Sep 1869	United States		
Panic of 1873	9 May 1873		Initiated the Long Depression in the United States and much of Europe.	
Paris Bourse crash of 1882	19 Jan 1882	France		
Panic of 1884	1884			
Encilhamento	1890	Brazil	Lasting 3 years, 1890–1893, a boom and bust process that boomed in late 1880s and burst on early 1890s, causing a collapse in the Brazilian economy and aggravating an already unstable political situation.	
Panic of 1893	1893	United States		
Panic of 1896	1896	United States		
Panic of 1901	17 May 1901	United States	Lasting 3 years, the market was spooked by the assassination of President William McKinley in 1901, coupled with a severe drought later the same year.	
Panic of 1907	Oct 1907	United States	Lasting over a year, markets took fright after U.S. President Theodore Roosevelt had threatened to rein in the monopolies that flourished in various industrial sectors, notably railways.	
Wall Street crash of 1929	24–29 Oct 1929	United States	Lasting over 4 years, the bursting of the speculative bubble in shares led to further selling, as people who had borrowed money to buy shares had to cash them in, when their loans were called in. Also called the Great Crash or the Wall Street Crash, leading to the Great Depression.	
Recession of 1937–1938	1937	United States	Lasting around a year, this share price fall was triggered by an economic recession within the Great Depression and doubts about the effectiveness of Franklin D. Roosevelt's New Deal policy.	
Kennedy Slide of 1962	28 May 1962	United States	Also known as the 'Flash Crash of 1962'.	
Bear Market of 1970	Nov 1968	United States	Over 20 months, rising inflation along with rising interest rates combined with the ongoing Vietnam War caused the S&P 500 to decline by 36.1%, coinciding with the Cambodia campaign.	
Brazilian Markets Crash of 1971	Jul 1971	Brazil	Lasting through the 1970s and early-1980s, this was the end of a boom that started in 1969, compounded by the 1970s energy crisis coupled with early 1980s Latin American debt crisis.	
1973–1974 stock market crash	Jan 1973	United Kingdom; Worldwide	Lasting 23 months, dramatic rise in oil prices, the miners' strike and the downfall of the Heath government.	
Early 1980s recession	Nov 1980	United States; Worldwide	Over 21 months, rising interest rates to tame double-digit inflation caused the S&P 500 to decline by 27.1%.	
1980s oil glut	1981–1986	OPEC		
Souk Al-Manakh stock market crash	Aug 1982	Kuwait		
Black Monday	19 Oct 1987	United States; New Zealand	Infamous stock market crash that represented the greatest one-day percentage decline in U.S. stock market history, culminating in a bear market after a more than 20% plunge in the S&P 500 and Dow Jones Industrial Average. Among the primary causes of the chaos were program trading and illiquidity, both of which fueled the vicious decline for the day as stocks continued lower, even as volume grew lighter. Today, circuit breakers are in place, to prevent a repeat of Black Monday. After a 7% drop, trading would be suspended for 15 minutes, with the same 15 minute suspension kicking in after a 13% drop. However, in the event of a 20% drop, trading would be shut down for the remainder of the day. In New Zealand, the stock market continued to crash for the next 5 months, down to 60%.	
Rio de Janeiro Stock Exchange Crash	Jun 1989	Brazil	Rio de Janeiro Stock Exchange Crash, due to its weak internal controls and absence of credit discipline, that led to its collapse and from which it never recovered.	
Friday the 13th mini-crash	13 Oct 1989	United States	Failed leveraged buyout of United Airlines causes crash.	
Early 1990s recession	Jul 1990	United States	Iraq invaded Kuwait in August 1990, causing oil prices to increase. The Dow Jones Industrial Average dropped 18% in three months, from 2,911.63 on 3 July to 2,381.99 on 16 October 1990. This recession lasted approximately 8 months.	
Japanese asset price bubble	1991	Japan	Lasting approximately twenty years, through at least the end of 2011, share and property price bubble bursts and turns into a long deflationary recession. Some of the key-economic events, during the collapse of the Japanese asset price bubble, include the 1997 Asian financial crisis and the dot-com bubble. In addition, more recent economic events, such as the 2008 financial crisis and August 2011 stock markets fall, have prolonged this period.	
Black Wednesday	16 Sep 1992	United Kingdom	The Conservative government was forced to withdraw the pound sterling from the European Exchange Rate Mechanism (ERM), after they were unable to keep sterling above its agreed lower limit.	
1997 Asian financial crisis	2 Jul 1997	Thailand; Hong Kong; Philippines; South Korea; Indonesia	Investors deserted emerging Asian shares, including an overheated Hong Kong stock market. Crashes occur in: Thailand, Indonesia, South Korea, Philippines and elsewhere, reaching a climax in the October 27, 1997 mini-crash.	
October 27, 1997, mini-crash	27 Oct 1997		Global stock market crash that was caused by the 1997 Asian financial crisis.	
1998 Russian financial crisis	17 Aug 1998	Russia	The Russian government devalues the ruble, defaults on domestic debt and declares a moratorium on payment to foreign creditors.	
1999 Greek stock market crash	1999	Greece		
Dot-com bubble	10 Mar 2000	United States	Collapse of a technology bubble.	
Economic effects of the September 11 attacks	11 Sep 2001		The September 11 attacks caused global stock markets to drop sharply. The attacks themselves caused approximately $40 billion in insurance losses, making it one of the largest insured events ever.	
Stock market downturn of 2002	9 Oct 2002		Downturn in stock prices, during 2002, in stock exchanges across the United States, Canada, Asia and Europe. After recovering from lows reached following the September 11 attacks, indices slid steadily, starting in March 2002, with dramatic declines in July and September, leading to lows last reached in 1997 and 1998. See stock market downturn of 2002.	
Chinese stock bubble of 2007	27 Feb 2007	China	The SSE Composite Index of the Shanghai Stock Exchange tumbles 9% from unexpected selloffs (the largest drop in 10 years), triggering major drops in worldwide stock markets.	
2008 financial crisis / United States bear market of 2007–2009	11 Oct 2007; 16 Sep 2008	United States; Worldwide	Beginning in late 2007, fears about growing debt, the growing housing bubble and general economic weakness kicked off a selling spree in markets. This accelerated on September 16, 2008, due to U.S. financial institutions failing because of the collapse of subprime loans and credit default swap securities. This rapidly devolved into a global crisis, resulting in a number of bank failures in Europe and sharp reductions in the value of equities (stock) and commodities worldwide. The failure of banks in Iceland resulted in a devaluation of the Icelandic króna and threatened the government with bankruptcy. Iceland was able to secure an emergency loan from the IMF in November. Later on, U.S. President George W. Bush signs the Emergency Economic Stabilization Act into law, creating a Troubled Asset Relief Program (TARP) to purchase failing bank assets. Had disastrous effects on the world economy along with world trade.	
2009 Dubai debt standstill	27 Nov 2009	UAE	Dubai requested a debt deferment, following its massive renovation and development projects, as well as the Great Recession. The announcement caused global stock markets to drop.	
Eurozone crisis	27 Apr 2010	Europe	Standard & Poor's downgraded Greece's sovereign credit rating to junk, four days after the activation of a €45-billion EU–IMF bailout, triggering the decline of stock markets worldwide and of the Euro's value and furthering the Euro area crisis.	
2010 flash crash	6 May 2010	United States	The Dow Jones Industrial Average suffered its worst intra-day point loss, dropping nearly 1,000 points before partially recovering.	
August 2011 stock markets fall	1 Aug 2011	United States	S&P 500 entered a short-lived bear market between 2 May 2011 (intraday high: 1,370.58) and 4 October 2011 (intraday low: 1,074.77), a decline of 21.58%. The stock market rebounded thereafter and ended the year flat.	
2015–16 Chinese stock market crash	12 Jun 2015	China	The Chinese stock market crashed in June and continued falling in July and August. In January 2016, the market also experienced a steep sell-off, which set off a global rout.	
2015–2016 stock market selloff	18 Aug 2015	United States	The Dow Jones fell 588 points during a two-day period, 1,300 points from 18 to 21 August. On Monday, 24 August, world stock markets were down substantially, wiping out all gains made in 2015, with interlinked drops in commodities, such as oil, which hit a six-year price low, copper and most Asian currencies – with exception of the Japanese yen – losing value against the United States dollar. With this plunge, an estimated ten trillion dollars had been wiped off the books on global markets, since 3 June.	
2018 cryptocurrency crash	20 Sep 2018		The S&P 500 index peaked at 2,930 on its 20 September close and dropped 19.73% to 2,351 by Christmas Eve. Bitcoin price peaked on 17 Dec '17, then fell 45% on 22 Dec '17. The DJIA falls 18.78%, during roughly the same period. Shanghai Composite dropped to a four-year low, escalating their economic downturn, since the 2015 recession.	
2020 stock market crash	24 Feb 2020	Worldwide	The S&P 500 index dropped 34% (1,145 points), at its peak of 3,386 on 19 February to 2,237 on 23 March. This crash was part of a worldwide recession caused by the COVID-19 lockdowns.	
2022 stock market decline	3 Jan 2022	Worldwide	The S&P 500 index peaked at 4,796 on its 3 January close and dropped 27.55%, to 3,498 by October 2022. The DJIA fell 18.78%, since its 4 January high. Nasdaq Composite fell 36.40% from its 19 November high.	
2022 Russian stock market crash	16 Feb 2022	Russia	As a reaction to the upcoming Russian invasion in Ukraine, the MOEX Index fell 43.58% in four trading days. In response, the markets were closed for a month by the Central Bank of Russia, to prevent even deeper decline. After re-opening on 24 March, the index partially recovered, but was still down roughly 40% compared to before the invasion.	
2024 China stock market crash	2 Feb 2024	China	The Shanghai Composite Index plummeted from a high of 3,703 in September 2021 to 2,730 on 2 February 2024, marking a 26.3% decline ahead of the Chinese New Year, prompted by sluggish economic recovery from COVID-19 and downturns in real estate. The government swiftly intervened in the stock market following the crash, by prohibiting short selling and reshuffling government officials.	
2024 Tokyo stock market crash	5 Aug 2024	Japan	A combination of rising interest rates and a strengthening yen had contributed to a recent unwinding of yen carry trades. Weaker than expected US economic figures (released after Japanese markets had closed for the weekend) led to a global selloff. Upon reopening, the Nikkei 225 recorded a single-day loss of 12.4%, its worst performance since Black Tuesday in October 1987.	
2025 stock market crash	3 Apr 2025; 4 Apr 2025	United States / Worldwide	On April 2, 2025, President Donald Trump announced large tariffs on all US imports. On April 4, China retaliated with a 34% tariff on all American imports. By the close of trade of April 4, the Dow Jones had lost over 9%, with the S&P 500 entering a bear market and losing 10%, and the Nasdaq Composite entering a bear market and losing 11%. At the lowest point on the following Monday, April 7, the S&P 500 was down 23% from its recent all-time high in February 2025.	
2026 Chinese Stock Market Slide	June 22 – October 23	China	China's benchmark CSI 300 Index officially entered a technical bear market on Thursday, October 22, 2026, after dropping 20.2% from its June peak. This sharp downturn has wiped out approximately $2.4 trillion in market value over a 10-week rout. The collapse was primarily driven by a global reversal in artificial intelligence trades, punishing hardware and semiconductor sectors like the SSE Star 50.	

== See also ==
- 1991 Indian economic crisis
- Economic bubble
- List of banking crises
- List of economic crises
- List of largest daily changes in the Dow Jones Industrial Average
- List of recessions in the United Kingdom
- List of recessions in the United States
- Stock market crashes in India
