= Bull (stock market speculator) =

Stock market speculator who buys with the expectation of short-term increase in value

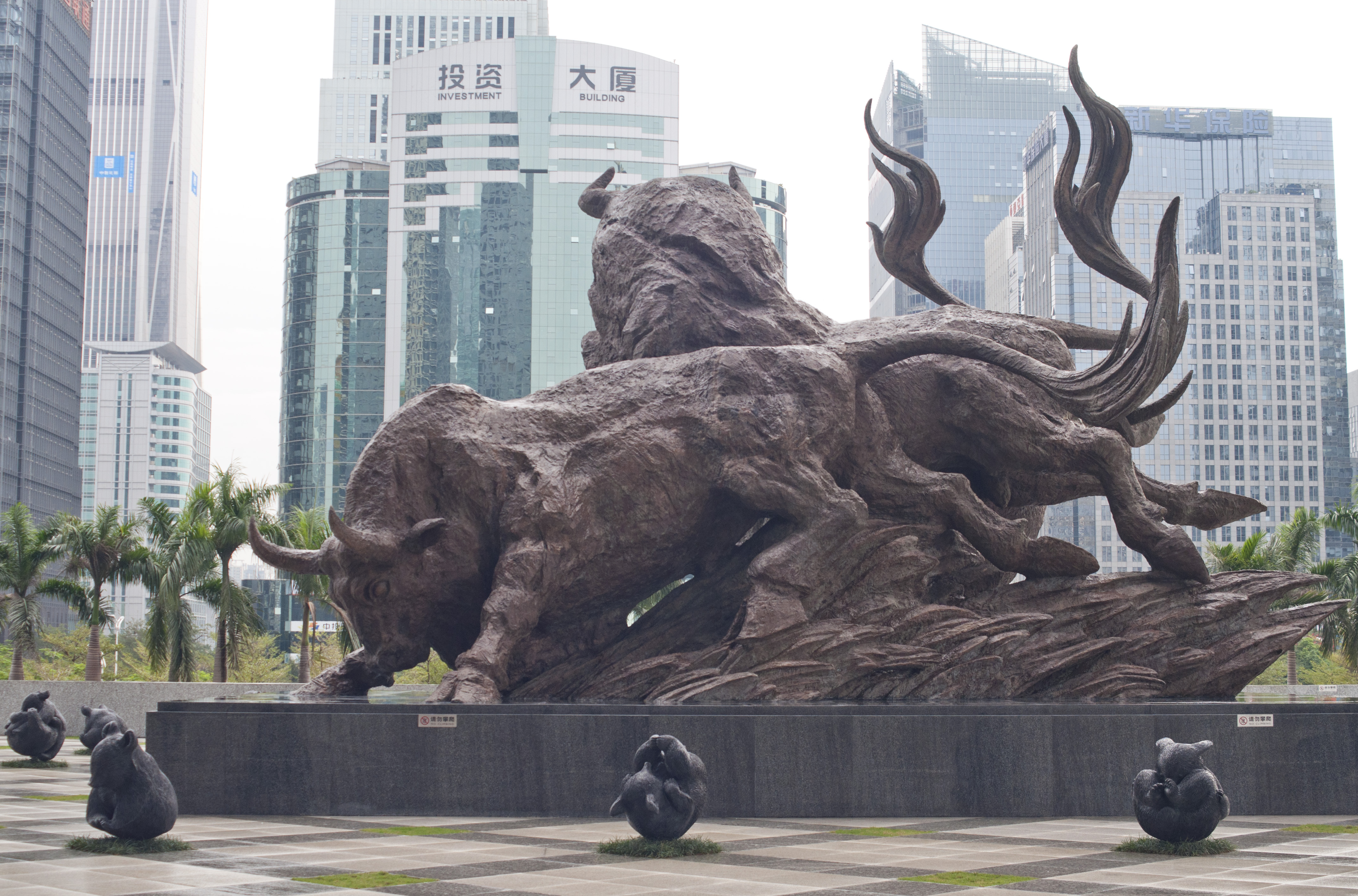
Sculpture of a bull in front of Shenzhen Stock Exchange, China, surrounded by small tumbling bears on the ground

In finance, a bull is a speculator in a stock market who buys a holding in a stock in the expectation that, in the very short-term, it will rise in value, whereupon they will sell the stock to make a quick profit on the transaction. Strictly speaking, the term applies to speculators who borrow money to fund such a purchase, and are thus under great pressure to complete the transaction before the loan is repayable or the seller of the stock demands payment on settlement day for delivery of the bargain. If the value of the stock falls contrary to their expectation, a bull suffers a loss, frequently very large if they are trading on margin. A bull has a great incentive to "talk-up" the value of their stock or to manipulate the market of their stock, for example by spreading false rumors, to procure a buyer or to cause a temporary price increase which will provide them with the selling opportunity and profit they require.

A bull must be contrasted with an investor, who purchases a stock in expectation of a medium-term (5 years) or long-term increase in value due to the underlying performance of the company and its assets. The speculator who takes a directly opposite view to the bull is the bear, who speculates on a stock decreasing in value, having sold short. A bull market is a period during which stock market prices rise over a sustained period, therefore to the advantage of bulls.

== History of the term ==
An early mention of the terms bull and bear appears in the 1769 edition of Thomas Mortimer's book Every Man his own Broker, published in London, as follows, relating to speculators operating in Jonathan's Coffee-House in Exchange Alley (the original London proto-Stock Exchange):

"A Bull is the name by which the gentlemen of 'Change Alley choose to call all persons who contract to buy any quantity of government securities, without an intention or ability to pay for it, and who consequently are obliged to sell it again, either at a profit or a loss, before the time comes when they have contracted to take it".

This refers to the former practice of stock-brokers, abolished circa 1980's in London, allowing their clients to trade on credit during a period of about two weeks, known as an account, on the completion of which all purchases and sales made during the account period had to be paid for on the settlement date. A net trading loss would result in the client having to make a cash payment to the broker.

== Quasi-fraudster ==
In early usage the terms bull and bear were akin to naming a variety of fraudster, as is made clear by Mortimer, writing about 40 years after the scandal of the South Sea Bubble:

"Notwithstanding all the wise precautions hitherto taken, only the more palpable and glaring frauds have been entirely suppressed. The Bubbles are indeed burst, and the Race Horses of Exchange-Alley long since dead, but Bulls and Bears still subsist in their original vigour and full strength. The late Sir John Barnard, whose name ought to be ever dear to the citizens of London for his long and faithful services in parliament, did indeed make an attempt to crush those monsters and their keepers; but his scheme was rejected, on account of its leaving a clog and restraint on the buying and selling of stock".

== Early example ==
Mortimer gives an example of a bull as follows:

"Thus a man who in March buys in the Alley £40,000 four per cent annuities 1760, for the rescounters in May, and at the same time is not worth ten pounds in the world, or, which is the same thing, has his money employed in trade, and cannot really take the annuities so contracted for, is a Bull, till such time as he can discharge himself of his heavy burden by selling it to another person, and so adjusting his account, which, if the whole house be Bulls, he will be obliged to do at a considerable loss; and in the interim (while he is betwixt hope and fear, and is watching every opportunity to ease himself of his load on advantageous terms, and when the fatal day is approaching that he must sell, let the price be what it will) he goes lowring up and down the house, and from office to office; and if he is asked a civil question, he answers with a surly look, and by his dejected, gloomy aspect and moroseness, he not badly represents the animal he is named after".

== Bull market ==
Prices in financial markets rise and fall. A bull market is a market condition in which prices are rising. This is the opposite of a bear market in which prices are declining. In the case of the stock market, a bull market occurs when major stock indices such as the S&P 500 and the Dow rise at least 20% and continue to rise. A bull market can last for months or even years.

Some common features of bull markets:

Investors are optimistic, or optimistic about stock prices. Stocks go up even when there is negative news about the economy or a particular stock. Growth is broad-based, and most stocks go up even if the company is doing poorly. The company's revenues are generally on the rise. The economy is thriving. Measures for this include quarterly growth in gross domestic product (GDP) and falling unemployment. Interest rates are not rising in a way that is seen as a threat to the market rally.

== Sculptures of stock-market bulls ==
Several bronze statues of bulls representing positive investor sentiment exist near the locations of several stock markets or brokerage houses, for example:

- Charging Bull, a bronze statue by Arturo Di Modica at Bowling Green, Manhattan, New York City
- Bulle und Bär sculptures by Norbert Marten in Viersen, Germany
- Sofia stock exchange, Bulgaria
- Frankfurt stock exchange, Germany
- Islamabad stock exchange, Pakistan
- Bombay Stock Exchange, India
- Amsterdam stock exchange (Beursplein 5), Netherlands

== Sources ==
- Mortimer, Thomas, Every Man his own Broker, or, A Guide to Exchange-Alley, 7th Edition, London, 1879
- Stock market, bull stock market, "every stock is lower", 9th edition, Banglore, India, 2022
