= 2025 stock market crash =

Global stock market crash

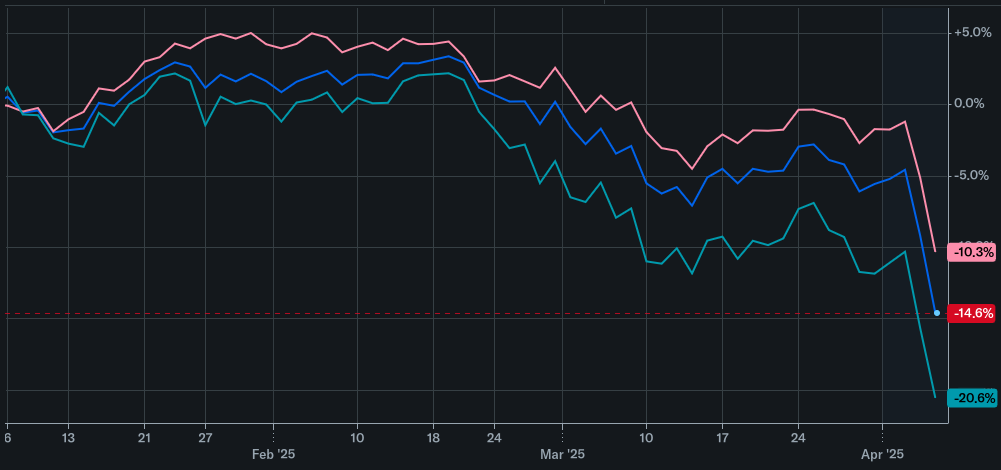
- The decline of the S&P 500 (dark blue), Nasdaq Composite (light blue), and Dow Jones (pink) on April 3–4. This graph is over a period of three months.
- Date: April 2–10, 2025 (1 week and 1 day)
- Type: Stock market crash
- Cause: 2025 US trade wars; 2025 Trump tariffs; Increased forecast of recession

Starting on April 2, 2025, global stock markets crashed amid increased volatility following the introduction of new tariff policies by U.S. president Donald Trump during his second term. On April 2, which he called "Liberation Day", Trump announced sweeping tariffs impacting nearly all sectors of the US economy. The announcement triggered widespread panic selling across global stock markets. It became the largest global market decline since the 2020 stock market crash, which occurred during the recession caused by the COVID-19 pandemic.

Trump entered his second term with a particularly strong domestic stock market. This momentum continued for several weeks after his inauguration. However, the administration soon began implementing increasingly aggressive trade policies aimed at advancing protectionism and applying economic pressure. These included escalating the ongoing trade war with China, starting a trade war with Canada and Mexico, imposing heavy tariffs, and heightening tensions with key allies. As these policies took effect, financial markets grew increasingly turbulent and volatile, with a growing sense of uncertainty.

As stock prices declined, investors initially moved into bonds, pushing down yields. The Trump administration pointed to the yield drop as evidence that its tariff measures were helping reduce borrowing costs. However, this trend quickly reversed as bond markets began to experience widespread selling as well, described as an example of bond vigilantism. The spike in bond yields, attributed to waning investor confidence in US fiscal policy, led to emergency responses by several governments.

The Trump administration announced it would pause tariff increases on April 9, 2025, leading to a stock market rally with major US indices posting their largest gains in years. Following further walk backs and initial trade deals, the S&P 500 US stock market index turned positive for the year on May 13, 2025. By June 27, 2025, the S&P 500 and the NASDAQ closed at all time highs. The Trump administration eventually resumed their new tariffs on August 7, but with modifications to the rates and affected products. By December 2025, half of all imports were exempt.

== Background ==
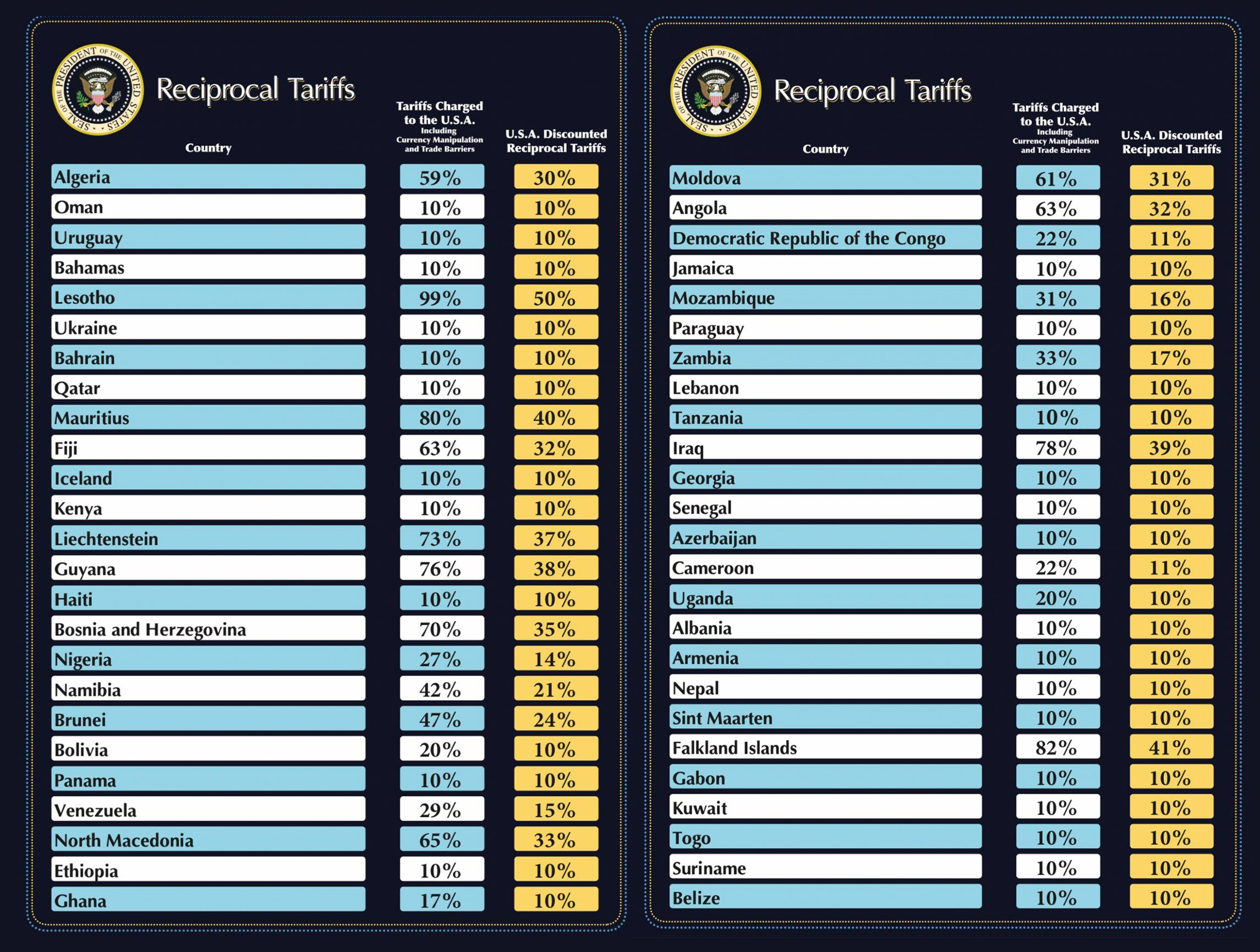
Some of the tariffs introduced on April 2, 2025. Note description below sub-title "Tariffs Charged to the U.S.A."

Since the start of his second term, Donald Trump has pursued a policy of economic autonomy and trade protectionism, in an attempt to incentivize the growth of US-based industry and manufacturing and reduce the country's trade deficit. To this end, the Trump administration initiated a broad increase in import tariffs to induce other countries to buy and invest in American products and industry. This heightened tensions in the already ongoing U.S−China trade war as higher tariff rates were introduced, and initiated a trade war with Mexico and Canada through new tariffs on Mexican and Canadian imports. This gradually created stock market instability and raised fears of a possible recession. By February 2025, the stock market had entered a decline.

On March 21, 2025, Trump announced a "Liberation Day" on which he would present large-scale tariffs onto countries with a trade deficit. Though no specifics were provided beyond the promise of increased tariffs, fears of a larger trade war began to create more market volatility. Prior to the announcement, the S&P 500 dropped by 10.1% by March 13 of that year, following its February peak. Donald Trump announced Liberation Day would occur on April 2, because he "didn't want [it] to be April Fool's Day because then nobody would believe what I said", and that on that day, he would introduce worldwide tariffs. Trump imposed the tariffs unilaterally under powers granted by the International Emergency Economic Powers Act by declaring that the United States' ongoing trade deficit was a national emergency. Upon their introduction, the new tariffs were incredibly broad, including but not limited to: a 10% "baseline" tariff imposed on all imports barring a few resource exceptions (including on the uninhabited McDonald Islands), a 54% rate for China (which was eventually raised to 245%), a 20% rate for the European Union, 46% for Vietnam, 36% for Thailand, 24% for Japan, 49% for Cambodia, and 32% for Taiwan.

While economic protectionism has become increasingly popular among Americans over the last decade, the sweeping tariffs faced immediate and bipartisan backlash from many Americans, including protectionists, both Republican Party and Democratic Party officials, and economists citing it as an abuse of power, an over-extension of economic policy, a "worse than the worst-case scenario" for US markets or a potential "Black Monday" related-event. The tariffs also precipitated concern among world leaders.

== Initial downturn ==
=== North America ===
Immediately after Trump's afternoon announcement on April 2, stock futures tumbled. Futures linked to the S&P 500 lost 3.9%. Nasdaq-100 futures lost 4.7% while Dow Jones Industrial Average futures dropped 2.7%.

On April 3, the Nasdaq Composite lost 1,600 points, the worst sell-off since the start of the COVID-19 pandemic. The S&P 500 lost 4.84% of its value on April 3. The Dow also fell 1,679 points or 3.98%. The Russell 2000 lead losses by falling 6.59%, entering a bear market.

The following day, April 4, China imposed a 34% retaliatory tariff. The Dow Jones fell 2,231 points or 5.5%. The S&P 500 lost 5.97%, the second straight day of losses. The Nasdaq Composite lost 5.8%, entering it into bear market territory.

Within two days, the Dow Jones index lost over 4,000 points (9.48%), S&P losing 10%, and Nasdaq losing 11%. Over $6.6 trillion was lost – the largest two-day loss in history. That period was also the first time that the Dow Jones Industrial Average shed over 1,500 points consecutively over multiple days. It was also the worst ever two-day period for the S&P 500. Over those two days, the Chicago Board Options Exchange's VIX benchmark, nicknamed "Wall Street's fear gauge", spiked 15 points to close at 45.31 points, the highest close since the 2020 stock market crash. Oil prices fell over 7% by April 4, closing at 2021 levels.

The first of Trump's new tariffs, a 10% minimum tariff on nearly all imports to the US, went into effect on Saturday, April 5. After markets opened on April 7, stocks plunged further. The three-day losses became the worst since Black Monday. Rumors of the Trump administration considering a 90–day pause on all tariffs excluding China began to spread online. White House Press Secretary Karoline Leavitt denied such claims and labeled them as fake news. The markets responded by decreasing once again in an hour. By the time that the US markets had closed on that day, modestly lower than the previous day on April 6, the Dow Jones index ended up losing over 300 points, though Nasdaq had a slight increase after recording the largest intraday comeback since 2008.

By the following day, on April 8, US markets significantly improved, with the Dow Jones index earning 400 points, while the S&P and Nasdaq received less than 1% more. This was due to comments by Trump about Japan negotiating with the US. However, markets began to fall within a few hours of Trump's announcement of plans to increase levies in China by 84%, bringing the total tariffs to 104%, which was expected to go into effect by midnight. As a result, the Dow Jones index lost all of its morning gains and fell by around 300 points, as did the S&P 500 and Nasdaq, which erased their gains and dropped 1% and 2%, respectively. The stock market surged significantly on April 9, immediately after Trump confirmed a 90-day decrease to 10% on all tariffs except those imposed on China. On April 10, the stock market plunged once more due to the uncertainty of the 90-day extension.

=== International ===
By April 8, crude oil closed at around $60 per barrel, the lowest level since 2021. West Texas Intermediate (WTI) showed a sharp decline, dropping below $60 per barrel. It reached as low as $58.95 before a slight recovery but maintained the weakest position since 2021. Brent Crude fell by 3.7% to $63.15 per barrel, also marking its lowest level since 2021. These drops occurred due to the fears of a possible recession and thereby a decrease in the demand for oil. Similarly, base metals, such as copper, and the coffee industry both saw a decline in price amid recession fears. The coffee industry is almost entirely located within regions with tariffs applied by the United States, a country that intakes a large sum of coffee grounds through imports.

The Canadian TSX decreased by 3.8% within 24 hours, followed by 4.6% the following day, April 4. Three days later on April 7, TSX reached a seven-month low since September 6 of last year, as well as energy shares and financial shares.

==== Asia ====
In Korea, the KOSPI Composite Index fell over 5%. In Japan, the Nikkei 225 experienced its largest loss since March 2020 at 7%, triggering a trading curb, and extending the economic downturn it had experienced over the last week at 9%. On April 6, the Nikkei 225 suffered its third-largest daily point loss, eventually closing with its lowest finish since October 2023. However, the stock market rose the following day, gaining more than 1,800 points. Futures trading was temporarily halted due to the trading curb. The S&P/ASX 200 was resilient the first few days, sustaining only a small decrease; however, April 7 saw it drop by 6% within 30 minutes. In Thailand, Stock Exchange of Thailand announced a ban on short selling of most securities. On April 8, in Pakistan, the KSE 100 index initially declined by 6,287.22 points, or 5.29%, triggering a market halt. It declined by a cumulative 8,687.69 points, or 7.31% shortly after resumption of trading. It was down 3,882.18 points, or 3.27% at the closing.

==== Europe ====
The STOX 600 index saw a decrease of 2.6% on April 3 before falling 3.1% the next day. The week's 8.4% loss was the index's worst week in five years. The following trade week, starting April 7, it fell by 6% before closing at a 4.54% decrease. On April 7, Barclays downgraded its end of year predictions for the index from 580 to 490 while warning that its forecast had little weight because "there is no precedent, nor fundamental framework to rely on for this crisis."

The FTSE 100 dropped almost 5% on April 4, marking a three−month low and the largest daily drop since March 2020; every stock on the index fell except for JD Sports. The FTSE 250 also fell, dropping 4.4% to a 16-month low. Upon opening on April 7, the FTSE 100 fell by more than 6% but recovered slightly by the end of the day, resulting in a decrease of 4.25%.

The Spanish IBEX fell 5.83% on April 4, its largest decrease of the year. On April 7, it dropped a further 7% before closing 5.12% down, with the prices of all of the constituent stocks falling.

==== Africa ====
The Johannesburg Stock Exchange, the largest in Africa, experienced its greatest decrease of the year, losing more than 9% of its value after Trump ordered tariffs of 30% on South Africa.

== Bond market sell-off ==
As the stock market crashed, demand for bonds initially rose, pushing bond yields—which move inversely—down. The 10-year Treasury yield fell to 3.86% on April 4, its lowest since October 2024. When yields fall, correlated interest rates on loans like mortgages also fall, making borrowing money cheaper. The Trump administration said it was aiming to lower the 10-year yield to cut borrowing costs and cited the drop as a benefit of its tariff plan.

However, in a sharp reversal, the bond market began crashing too, sending yields higher. The 10-year yield surged to 4.5% by the morning of April 9. The 30-year yield surged 54 basis points to 4.92%, its biggest three-day jump since 1982. The Japanese 30-year government bond yield surged to 21-year highs and Britain's 30-year bond yields rose to their highest since 1998.

The spike in yields shocked traders and government officials. In Japan, the Bank of Japan, Ministry of Finance, and Financial Services Agency held an emergency meeting, calming some of the aggressive selling. The Bank of England shifted from selling long-term bonds acquired during the 2008 crisis to selling short-term bonds to ease pressure. Traders called the spike in yields a "Liz Truss moment," referencing a 2022 UK government crisis when unfunded tax cuts triggered a bond market sell off. The upturn was considered an example of bond vigilantism.

Explanations for the bond sell-off include rising inflation expectations due to tariffs, margin calls amid the stock crash, and dumping of US government bonds due to declining trust in US—especially by foreign investors and governments, who hold about 33% of US Treasuries. The Associated Press described it as a "freak" sell-off and highlighted experts who attributed it to a loss of confidence among investors in the United States as a safe, stable place to store money. The New York Times noted investors instead moved money into gold, the Swiss franc and German government bonds.

Business executives and Republican allies placed numerous calls to the Trump administration asking them to reconsider their tariff plans. Senator Ted Cruz said that he and other senators urged Trump to reverse course, but that it "did not go well" and that Trump yelled and cursed during their lengthy phone call.

== Tariff walk backs and market reversal ==
On Wednesday, April 9, tariffs increased from the 10% baseline to 11–50% for 57 major trading partners. The same morning, George Saravelos, head of FX at Deutsche Bank, told investors, "We are witnessing a simultaneous collapse in the price of all US assets including equities, the dollar... and the bond market." He said if the disruption continued, the Federal Reserve would have to intervene by emergency buying mass amounts of US Treasuries to stabilize the bond market.

Treasury Secretary Scott Bessent and Commerce Secretary Howard Lutnick rushed to raise concerns about the bond market sell-off to Trump. Trump agreed to reduce pressure by pausing the tariff increases that had gone into effect that morning. The 10% baseline tariff on all countries, 25% tariffs on certain product sectors, and increased tariffs on Chinese goods would remain.

The pause was announced in post to Trump's Truth Social. Lawmakers were frustrated with how the world learned of Trump's decisions—through a social media platform operated by Trump's company, instead of through federal administration officials. Democratic Senator Adam Schiff called on Congress to investigate whether Trump had engaged in suspicious insider trading or market manipulation when he abruptly announced and paused the tariffs, the government's handling of the jobs and retirement savings of millions of Americans, and the US's standing in global, as having encountered an unprecedented crisis of trust because of the Trump administration's unrestrained behavior.

Trump said later that he, Bessent and Lutnick "didn't have access to lawyers or – it was just wrote up. We wrote it up from our hearts, right? It was written from the heart, and I think it was well written too, but it was written from the heart." He also told reporters, "the bond market is very tricky. I was watching it... I saw last night where people were getting a little queasy". CNN reported many White House officials learned of the pause at the same time as the public.

The pause announcement led to a historic rally. The S&P 500 rose 9.52% for its biggest one-day gain since 2008. The Dow Jones rose 7.87%, for its biggest gain since March 2020, and the Nasdaq rose 12.16% for its largest one-day gain since January 2001 and its second-best day ever.

Bond yields remained high, with the 10-year Treasury yield nearing 4.6% on Friday, April 11. Politico noted that despite the pause, the remaining tariffs meant the United States' average effective tariff rate was still at its highest in a century. Late Friday, the Trump administration announced it would at least temporarily exempt a variety of high-demand tech devices from the reciprocal tariff rates, including smartphones, computers, solar cells, and flat panel TV displays. China also began to exempt a variety of American exports that could not easily be replaced.

By May 2, major stock indexes were on track to recover their losses since Trump's April 2 "Liberation Day" announcement. The S&P 500 recorded its ninth consecutive daily gain, closing above its April 2 level. By this time, China had exempted approximately $40 billion worth of American goods from tariffs, while the United States had exempted about $102 billion worth of Chinese imports, based on 2024 import volumes. Both countries expressed an interest in engaging in trade talks to reduce tariffs.

On May 12, the US and China agreed to a temporary deal. The US would cut tariffs on Chinese products to 30% and China would cut tariffs on American products to 10% minimum for 90 days. The next day, on May 13, the S&P 500 turned positive for the year. The S&P 500 recovered from the crash on June 27, 2025, closing at 6,173.07 and reaching a new all-time high.

Although the pause Trump announced was expected to last 90 days, it was extended until August 7. Trump continued to exempt products from the tariffs to reduce pressure on the U.S. economy, and by December 2025, half of all imports to the U.S. were exempt from the tariffs he announced on April 2.

== Index changes ==
Index	Country	April 3		April 4		April 7		April 8		April 9		April 10	
Index	Country	Close	Change	Close	Change	Close	Change	Close	Change	Close	Change	Close	Change
Dow Jones	United States	40,545.93	▼−1,679.39 (−3.98%)	38,314.86	▼−2,231.07 (−5.50%)	37,965.60	▼−349.26 (−0.91%)	37,645.59	▼−320.01 (−0.84%)	40,608.45	▲2,962.86 (+7.87%)	39,593.66	▼-1,014.79 (−2.50%)
Nasdaq	United States	16,550.60	▼−1,050.44 (−5.97%)	15,587.79	▼−962.82 (−5.82%)	15,603.26	▲15.48 (+0.099%)	15,267.91	▼−335.35 (−2.15%)	17,124.97	▲1,857.06 (+12.16%)	16,387.31	▼-737.66 (−4.31%)
S&P 500	United States	5,396.52	▼−274.45 (−4.84%)	5,074.08	▼−322.44 (−5.97%)	5,062.25	▼−11.83 (−0.23%)	4,982.77	▼−79.48 (−1.57%)	5,456.90	▲474.13 (+9.52%)	5,268.05	▼-188.85 (−3.46%)
Russell 2000	United States	1,910.55	▼−134.82 (−6.59%)	1,830.26	▼−80.29 (−4.20%)	1,810.14	▼−16.89 (−0.92%)	1,760.71	▼−49.43 (−2.73%)	1,913.16	▲152.45 (+8.66%)	1,831.39	▼-81.77 (−4.27%)
EURO STOXX 50	Eurozone List: Austria; Belgium; Croatia; Cyprus; Estonia; Finland; France; Germany; Greece; Ireland; Italy; Latvia; Lithuania; Luxembourg; Malta; Netherlands; Portugal; Slovakia; Slovenia; Spain	5,113.28	▼−190.67 (−3.59%)	4,878.31	▼−234.97 (−4.60%)	4,656.41	▼−221.90 (−4.55%)	4,773.65	▲117.24 (+2.52%)	4,622.14	▼-156.75 (−3.80%)	4,818.92	▲196.78 (4.26%)
SSE Composite	China	3,342.01	▼−8.12 (−0.24%)	Closed due to market holiday		3,096.58	▼−245.43 (−7.34%)	3,145.55	▲48.97 (+1.58%)	3,186.81	▲41.26 (+1.31%)	3,223.64	▲36.83 (+1.16%)
DAX index	Germany	21,717.39	▼−673.45 (−3.01%)	20,641.72	▼−1,075.67 (−4.95%)	19,789.62	▼−852.10 (−4.13%)	20,280.26	▲490.64 (+2.48%)	19,670.88	▼-609.38 (−3.00%)	20,562.73	▲891.85 (+4.53%)
Nikkei 225	Japan	34,735.93	▼−989.94 (−2.77%)	33,780.58	▼−955.35 (−2.75%)	31,136.58	▼−2,644.00 (−7.83%)	33,012.58	▲+1,876.00 (+6.03%)	31,714.03	▼-1,298.55 (−3.93%)	34,609.00	▲+2,894.97 (+8.36%)
KOSPI	South Korea	2,486.70	▼−19.16 (−0.76%)	2,465.42	▼−21.28 (−0.86%)	2,328.20	▼−137.22 (−5.57%)	2,334.23	▲+6.03 (+2.06%)	2,293.70	▼-40.53 (−1.74%)	2,445.06	▲+151.36 (+6.19%)
S&P/ASX 200	Australia	7,859.70	▼−75.00 (−0.94%)	7,667.80	▼−192.20 (−2.44%)	7,343.30	▼−324.50 (−4.23%)	7,510.00	▲+166.70 (+2.27%)	7,375.00	▼-135.00 (−1.80%)	7,709.60	▲+334.60 (+4.34%)
S&P/TSX	Canada	24,335.77	▼−971.41 (−3.84%)	23,193.47	▼−1,142.30 (−4.70%)	22,859.46	▼−334.01 (−1.44%)	22,506.90	▼−352.56 (−1.54%)	23,727.03	▲+1,220.13 (+5.42%)	23,014.87	▼-712.16 (−3.00%)

== Response ==
=== United States ===
==== Republican Party officials ====
Following "Liberation Day", after the US stock market lost significant value, President Donald Trump said on April 3 regarding his tariffs that events were "going very well", as the "markets are going to boom, the stock is going to boom, the country is going to boom". The next day, Trump addressed investors, declaring on social media: "my policies will never change. This is a great time to get rich, richer than ever before!!!" Treasury Secretary Scott Bessent commented on April 6: "I see no reason that we have to price in a recession".

Stephen Moore, who served as an economic advisor to Trump, expressed his concerns about the president's trade approach, stating that "It's a question of what the pain threshold is for the American people and the Republican voters" and adding that "We've all lost a lot of money". Bill Ackman, who supported Trump in his 2024 presidential campaign, said that "business investment will grind to a halt, (and) consumers will close their wallets". Texas senator Ted Cruz commented on a potential "bloodbath" in the 2026 midterms in the event that a recession took place, claiming that it "would destroy jobs here at home, and do real damage to the US economy".

Despite Trump's insistence, Chair of the Federal Reserve Jerome Powell refused to issue emergency cuts to lower interest rates. On April 4, Trump shared a video on social media claiming that he is crashing the stock market on purpose to force the Fed to lower interest rates.

==== Democratic Party officials ====
DNC chair Ken Martin blamed Trump for the stock market crash, claiming Trump "is actively driving the economy off the rails." Rep. Hakeem Jeffries, the Democratic leader in the House of Representatives, also blamed the stock market crash on President Trump. Senator Chuck Schumer stated, "this chaos is all game to Donald Trump". "He thinks he's playing Red Light, Green Light with the economy," Schumer said. "But it is very real for American families." “These constant gyrations in policy provide dangerous opportunities for insider trading,” Senator Adam Schiff said. “Who in the administration knew about Trump’s latest tariff flip-flop ahead of time? Did anyone buy or sell stocks, and profit at the public’s expense? I’m writing to the White House – the public has a right to know.” The New York representative Alexandria Ocasio-Cortez echoed similar concerns, urging any member of Congress who purchased stocks over the last two days to disclose that. The Democratic House whip, Katherine Clark, wrote: “Two hours before announcing his tariff pause, Trump told his paid Truth Social subscribers it was ‘a great time to buy’ on the stock market. Corruption is the name of their game.” The Nevada representative Steven Horsford questioned the US trade representative, Jamieson Greer, asking the representative during a committee hearing whether the climbdown was market manipulation.

==== Golf trip controversy ====
Trump received widespread criticism for continuing with a planned golf trip and fundraising event at his Mar-a-Lago resort estate in Florida during the crash. On April 7, he responded with a social media post telling people "Don't be a PANICAN (a new party based on Weak and Stupid people!)"

Senator Adam Schiff stated on NBC's Meet the Press that "people have seen their retirement savings on fire. And there he is out on the golf course".

==== Insider trading allegations ====
On April 9, Trump posted on Truth Social that "THIS IS A GREAT TIME TO BUY!!! DJT", referring to the stock market or specifically Trump Media & Technology Group which has a NASDAQ symbol of DJT. Less than 4 hours later, Trump announced a pause on reciprocal tariffs for all countries besides China, resulting in soaring stock prices. In addition, options trading volume jumped in the minutes before the announcement of the pause in tariffs. It was unclear how many traders bought call options or if they had been closed for a gain. Experts had noted a record surge in options trading in recent days due to heavy market volatility, making it difficult to determine if the calls were suspicious. Democratic members of Congress, including minority leaders Hakeem Jeffries and Chuck Schumer, raised allegations of possible insider trading from Trump and other Republicans, despite a lack of evidence of wrongdoing.

=== International ===
==== Germany ====
In response to the tariffs, the German Chancellor Olaf Scholz stated "This is an attack on a trade order [...] that is essentially a result of American efforts".

==== Australia ====
The prime minister of Australia Anthony Albanese reacted to the tariffs on the Heard Island and McDonald Islands, an uninhabited external territory of Australia, saying "It just shows and exemplifies the fact that nowhere on Earth is safe from this". On April 7, Australian stocks began to fall substantially.

==== China ====
On the same day as "Liberation Day", China announced retaliatory tariffs of 34% against the United States, as a response to the tariffs placed on them, starting on April 10. Donald Trump responded to this on Truth Social proclaiming "China played it wrong, they panicked − the one thing they cannot afford to do!" implying that the tariffs on China would not be lifted, eventually leading to another drop in stocks.

The Chinese stock market lost considerable value along with other global markets. In response, China suspended imports from some American companies and put export controls on earth minerals and various technologies. Foreign Ministry spokesperson Lin Jian called the tariffs "protectionist bullying", while imploring American companies to take steps to safeguard the stability of the global supply chain. On April 8, some Chinese state-owned enterprises announced plans to increase share investment to calm markets in response to US tariffs.

=== Corporations ===
Companies Klarna, Chime, and StubHub all paused IPO plans due to the stock market's volatility. An overwhelming majority of corporate leaders have expressed concern that the administration's policies have had a negative impact on their businesses.

== See also ==
- List of stock market crashes and bear markets
- List of largest daily changes in the Dow Jones Industrial Average
- 2020 stock market crash
- 2010 flash crash
- Black Monday (1987)
- Smoot–Hawley Tariff Act
