= Magazine cover indicator =

Economic indicator

The magazine cover indicator is a somewhat irreverent economic indicator, though sometimes taken seriously by technical analysts, which says that the cover story on the major business magazines, particularly BusinessWeek, Forbes and Fortune in the United States is often a contrary indicator.

A famous example is a 1979 cover of BusinessWeek titled "The Death of Equities". The 1970s had been a generally bad decade for the stock market and at the time the article was written the Dow Jones Industrial Average was at 800. However, 1979 roughly marked a turning point, and stocks went on to enjoy a bull market for the better part of two decades. Even after the 2008 financial crisis, stocks remain far above their 1979 levels. Using the Magazine Cover Indicator, Business Week's projection that equities were dead should have been a buy signal. By the time an idea has had time to make its way to the business press, particularly a trading idea, then the idea has likely run its course. Similarly, good news on a cover can be taken as an ill omen. As Paul Krugman has joked, "Whom the Gods would destroy, they first put on the cover of Business Week."

Although there are a number of examples where magazines have been wrong, even spectacularly wrong, there is a tendency to ignore all the times the covers are right. In January 2008, for example, Business Week ran a cover story entitled "Meltdown; For Housing the Worst Is Yet To Come" and in July 2008 a cover story called "The Home Price Abyss; Why the threat of a free fall is growing" and indeed, for the rest of 2008 and into 2009 home prices continued to plummet. An investor who interpreted the magazine covers as a contrary indicator and purchased real estate would have lost much of their investment.

In 2016, Gregory Marks and Brent Donnelly of Citigroup looked at The Economist and "selected 44 cover images from between 1998 and 2016 that seemed to make an optimistic or pessimistic point." They found that impactful covers with a strong visual bias tended to be contrarian 68% of the time after 1 year. One recent example: The Economist's Living in a low rate world from September 2016, mere weeks before one of the fastest selloffs in global fixed income.
