= August 2011 stock markets fall =

International sharp drop in stock prices

The August 2011 stock markets fall was the sharp drop in stock prices in August 2011 in stock exchanges across the United States, Middle East, Europe and Asia. This was due to fears of contagion of the European sovereign debt crisis to Spain and Italy, as well as concerns over France's current AAA rating, concerns over the slow economic growth of the United States and its credit rating being downgraded. Severe volatility of stock market indexes continued for the rest of the year.

== Variables of stock market fall ==
In August 2011, investors lost trillions due to many different variables causing the stock market to fall. There was a debt crisis in Europe, uninspiring economic news, and a bust to U.S. credit rating which caused a fear of double dip recession. August 4, 2011 was a below average day in the stock market but ended in the worst day since 2009. Investors wanted to find safer ways to invest their money due to the 11 percent stock market fall in two weeks. As the market was falling, the United States and Europe were failing to fix the economic crisis occurring. Investors were moving their money to treasury bonds to increase the security of their investments, leading to the European Central Bank trying to recover the stock market drop, which was unsuccessful. This scared investors and did the opposite of what was wanted. The Central bank intervened by buying bonds from small countries, but not Italy and Spain. The Central bank would soon be overwhelmed by the huge amount of debt in these two countries. Investors were more unnerved due to the European Commission President, Manuel Barroso. Instead of downplaying the market crash, he confirmed the fears of the stock market crash due to political paralysis. There were large amounts of stocks in Europe being sold and the selling continued in the United States. By Thursday, it caused more than 15 billion stocks to change hands. Investors started to lose their faith in how reliable the corporate profiles were. All of this resulted in the S.& P. 500 to fall 10.7 percent from July 22, when it was at 1,345.

=== Downgrading of US credit rating ===
Standard & Poor's downgraded America's credit rating from AAA to AA+ on 6 August 2011 for the first time. The US had a AAA rating since 1941. Standard and Poor's said that it could go down further than AA+, with Moody's also warning of a potential downgrade of the government's credit rating.

== Commodities ==
=== Gold ===
Gold increased in value up to US$1750. Gold is typically considered a secure investment in times of economic uncertainty, with other investors and traders also investing in foreign currencies, such as the Swiss franc and Japanese yen, also considered to be safe investments.

== Market movements ==
=== Asia ===
Japan: On 4 August, the Japanese government intervened in currency markets in order to combat the overvalued state of the Yen by spending between ¥400 billion and ¥500 billion to help achieve and maintain an exchange rate of roughly US$1 to ¥80, a level seen as crucial to help exporters compete.

Thailand: On 8 August, the SET Index dropped by 15.19 points (1.39%) to 1,078.19 points, with the SET50 Index and SET100 Index revealing a drop of 11.04 points (1.45%) to 750.11 points and 24.55 points (1.48%) to 1,636.53 points respectively. Trading on 9 August saw greater slides, with the SET Index revealing 35.65 points (3.31%) down to 1,042.54 points, and similar results from the SET50 Index showing 25.19 points (3.36%) down to 724.92 points and the SET100 Index with 56.10 points (3.43%) down to 1,580.32 points.

=== Europe ===
France: The CAC 40 fell by 20% in two weeks. It fell by 5.5% on 18 August 2011. The CAC thus moved from 3,800 points to 3,000 points in 10 days. The CAC 40 closed at 2999.54 on 5 September 2011 compared with 3982.21 on 30 June 2011 (and 4157 in February).

Germany: The DAX fell by 5.8% on 18 August 2011. The DAX closed at 5246.20 on 5 September 2011, compared with 7376.24 on 30 June 2011.

Italy: The FTSE MIB fell from 19,491 on 21 July to 14,676 on 10 August.

Switzerland: Facing pressure of the Swiss franc from currency markets who see the currency as a safe haven, the Swiss National Bank announced 3 August cuts on three-month LIBOR interest rates down to near-0 and injected 50 billion more francs into the market to stem off the threat to the economy and price stability of the "massively overvalued" currency. The Swiss franc was successfully weakened by 1.9% to 1.1033 for the Euro and 1.1% to 77.04 centimes for the US dollar on 4 August. But continued interest by foreign investors to buy Swiss francs, especially after the announcement of the Federal Reserve to freeze US interest rates for 2 years, led to record high strength of the Swiss franc of 70.85 centimes to the US dollar on 9 August.

Turkey: On 5 August, the Turkish central bank announced the auction of US$50 million in an effort to protect the Turkish lira after the currency lost value due to benchmark interest rate cuts, with other daily foreign exchange auctions of US$60 million on 8 August and US$70 million on 9 August. Overnight borrowing rates were increased from 1.5% to 5%, along with lending rates for deposits of the US dollar and Euro reduced in order to boost foreign exchange liquidity.

United Kingdom: The FTSE 100 Index fell from over 5,900 points on 26 July to under 4,800 at 9:35 am on 9 August, its lowest level since July 2010. On 18 August 2011, it fell 4.5%. On 22 September 2011, the FTSE 100 fell 4.7%, the largest daily fall since 2 March 2009.

=== Middle East ===
As the Middle Eastern markets reacted first to the news of the downgraded US government credit rating, Sunday trading resulted in losses in all markets. The EGX30 closed down 4.17% on Sunday, with the Dubai Financial Market closing at 4.4% after plunging more than 5% before rebounding, seeing the Abu Dhabi Securities Exchange fall 2.53% by closing. The Saudi markets experienced early trading losses of 5.46% before recovering and closing at a loss of 0.88%. The Qatar Exchange closed at 2.51% after falling 3%, with the Tel Aviv Stock Exchange shedding 6.04%.

Trading on 9 August led to more losses, as the EGX30 fell to a 5% low, prompting a 30-minute freeze on activity, before recommencing with a drop to 5.75%, followed by a steady rebound to close at 4.75% down with 4,478 points. The Saudi markets experiencing similar loss to 4.27%, while Dubai and Abu Dhabi closed at a lower 1.95% and 1.34% dip respectively.

=== North America ===
United States: On 8 August, the S&P 500 lost 79.92 points (6.7%) to 1,119.46 points with all 500 stocks and ten industry groups falling, with the NASDAQ Composite falling 174.72 points (6.9%) to 2,357.69 points, contributing to an approximate US$2.5 trillion erased from global equity value; a total of US$7.8 trillion since 26 July.

S&P 500 entered a short-lived bear market between 2 May 2011 (intraday high: 1,370.58) and 4 October 2011 (intraday low: 1,074.77), a decline of 21.58%. The stock market rebounded thereafter and ended the year flat.

Canada: On 4 August, the Toronto Stock Exchange lost 435.90 points or 3.4% following the American markets and fear of overseas debt problems. With the Finance Minister's re-assurance of the strong Canadian banking system, and the Bank of Canada maintaining the same interest rate, the S&P/TSX Composite Index fared much better than other markets. On 6 August, the market fell to its lowest point of 11,670.96, and by 15 August, it had recovered almost all of its losses going back to 12,693.61. This was partly due to the high number of resource companies listed on the TSX gaining due to soaring commodity prices such as gold.

=== Oceania ===
Australia: On 8 August, the Australian Securities Exchange saw nearly A$35 billion of share value lost, with a plunge of 2.9% as panicked investors led share prices down into bear market territory, pressuring investors of high exposure to dump shares in favour of margin calls.

Trading on 9 August revealed a 5.5% drop at its worst point before recovering rapidly in closing with 268 points gain, with the ASX200 index ending with an overall gain of 48.7 points (1.22%) at 4034.8 points. Traders attributed the sudden recovery to an intervention by the Korean and Taiwanese governments. For the first time in 5 months (since March 2011), the Australian Dollar fell below parity with the US Dollar to 99.28¢ before recovering to 101.85¢ in afternoon trade (but 1.5% below Monday's close), seeing the Australian Dollar's longest losing streak since the currency was floated in 1983.

=== South America ===
Brazil: On 8 August, the Bovespa Index fell 8.08% (4,281 points), dropping from 52,949 to 48,668 points. It was the biggest fall in a single day since 22 October 2008 (at the peak of the 2008 financial crisis), when Bovespa fell 10.18%. And it was also the lowest points level since 30 April 2009, when Bovespa closed at 47,289 points.

== Market intervention ==
=== Europe ===
Belgium, France, Greece, Italy, Spain: On 11 August (with the exception of Greece on 8 August), the market authorities of Belgium, Italy, France and Spain as well as the European financial regulator ESMA announced the ban of all forms of short selling on banks and other financial companies as a result of growing instability in markets on rumours of French banks risking downgrades and concerns of various European banks that are highly exposed to indebted nations such as Greece.

== See also ==
- European sovereign debt crisis
- United States federal government credit-rating downgrade, 2011
- Stock market crashes in India
