= Thomas Mortimer (writer) =

English writer (1730–1810)

Thomas Mortimer (1730–1810) was an English writer, known for his works in the field of economics, and for first documenting the financial terms bull and bear, in use in London at that time.

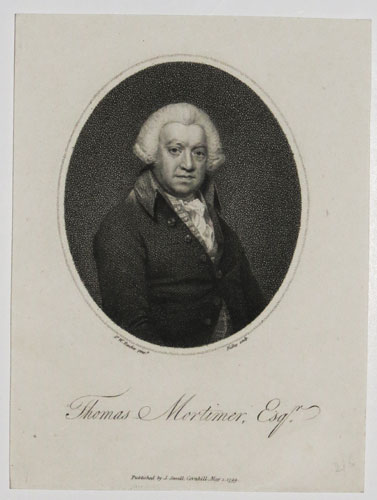
Thomas Mortimer, 1799 engraving

== Life ==
He was the son of Thomas Mortimer (1706–1741), principal secretary to Sir Joseph Jekyll, the Master of the Rolls, and grandson of John Mortimer, and was born on 9 December 1730 in Carey Street, Lincoln's Inn Fields in London. His mother died in 1744, and he was left under the guardianship of John Baker of Spitalfields.

Mortimer went to Harrow School, under James Cox, and then to a private academy in the north, but was largely self-taught. In 1750 he published An Oration on the much lamented death of H.R.H. Frederick, Prince of Wales, and began to study elocution. He also learnt French and Italian for his study of modern history.

In November 1762 Mortimer was made English vice-consul for the Austrian Netherlands, on the recommendation of John Montagu, 4th Earl of Sandwich, secretary of state, and went to Ostend. He hoped for the consulship; but Robert Wood was more successful at intrigue, as under-secretary to Lord Weymouth, and Mortimer was dismissed from his post in 1768, as a Wilkite; John Wilkes was known to be a personal friend of Mortimer. He returned to England, resumed his writing, and worked as a private tutor.

Mortimer died on 31 March 1810 in Clarendon Square, Somers Town, London.

== Works ==
Mortimer was a voluminous writer, mainly on economic subjects. His largest work was The British Plutarch (6 vols. 1762; 2nd ed., revised and enlarged, 1774). It was translated into French as Le Plutarque anglais by Cornélie Wouters, baronne de Vasse (1785-6, Paris, 12 vols.), which contained British biographies from Henry VIII to George II.

Besides pamphlets, Mortimer's economic publications were:

- Every Man his own Broker; or Guide to Exchange Alley, London 1761; 13th ed. 1801. Material was supplied by Mortimer's own experience on the Stock Exchange, where, by his own account, he lost heavily in 1756.
- The Universal Director, London 1763.
- A Concise Account of the Rise ... of the Society for the Encouragement of Arts, 1763. This early pamphlet source for the Society of Arts was anonymous.
- Dictionary of Trade and Commerce, London 2 vols. 1766; it covered geography, manufactures, architecture, the land-tax, and extraneous topics. A similar General Commercial Dictionary by Mortimer appeared in 1810, 3rd ed. 1823.
- The National Debt no Grievance, by a Financier, 1768.
- Elements of Commerce, London 1772; 2nd edit. 1802; translated into German by Johann Andreas Engelbrecht, Leipzig, 1783. Based on works of earlier economists, this work covered material had been used by Mortimer in a series of lectures given in London. It promoted the chamber of commerce concept, under the influence of Malachy Postlethwayt, Charles Davenant, and James Whiston. The author claimed credit for suggestions, according to which Lord North adopted taxes on menial servants, horses, machines, post-chaises, and other items; and for Lord Beauchamp's proposal for preventing arrests for debts under £6.
- Student's Pocket Dictionary, London, 1777; 2nd. edit. 1789.
- Lectures on the Elements of Commerce, Politics, and Finance, London 1801.
- Nefarious Practice of Stock Jobbing, London.
- A Grammar illustrating the Principles of Trade and Commerce, London, published after his death in 1810.

His New History of England, dedicated to Queen Charlotte, appeared (London 3 vols.) 1764–6.

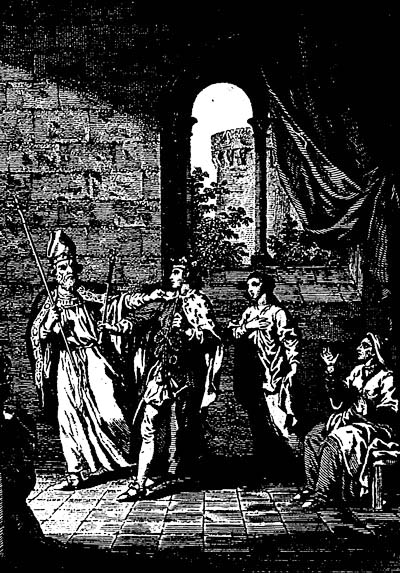
The Insolent Behaviour of Dunstan to King Edwy on the Day of his Coronation Feast, illustration after Samuel Wale in volume 1 of Thomas Mortimer's New History of England

Mortimer published revised editions of his grandfather John Mortimer's Whole Art of Husbandry in 1761, and of Wyndham Beawes's Lex Mercatoria in 1783. In 1751 he translated from the French Jean-Baptiste Jourdan's 1749 Life and Exploits of Pyrrhus. He also translated Jacques Necker's Treatise on the Finances of France, London 3 vols., 1785.

== Family ==
Mortimer married twice, and had a large family. A son, George, captain in the Royal Marines, published in 1791 Observations during a Voyage in the South Seas and elsewhere in the brig "Mercury," commanded by J. H. Cox, esq..

== Notes ==
Attribution

This article incorporates text from a publication now in the public domain: Lee, Sidney, ed. (1894). "Mortimer, Thomas". Dictionary of National Biography. Vol. 39. London: Smith, Elder & Co.
