= Bull–bear line =

Concept in technical analysis

Bull–bear line, in technical analysis is the value or line on a chart of the values of an index, which, when crossed, would result in a shift in the market trend between positive and negative. In some cases, the line can be the 200 or 250-day moving average, in other cases, it is just a value.

If the current index value drops below the bull–bear line, some investors believe the market trend has turned negative. If the current index rises above the line, some investors believe the market trend has turned positive.

However, according to Dow Theory by Charles Dow, the market trend is defined by investors' mindset and the transition between bull and bear markets is unpredictable, and determined after the fact.
