= Marie Wouters =

Marie Thérèse Wouters (c. 1739 – c. 1802) was a translator in the 18th century living in the Holy Roman Empire, in what is today Belgium. She is known for her work translating English-language literature into French, often in collaboration with her sister Cornélie Wouters de Vassé.

== Biography ==
Her dates of birth and death are unconfirmed, although one source cites her baptismal date as October 20, 1739, and she was alive at least as late as 1802. She was one of at least seven children born in Brussels to Jacques Corneille and Catherine Marguerite Wouters.

Wouters moved to Paris around the early 1780s. She is best known for her translations of English literature into French, often completed in collaboration with her sister Cornélie Wouters. Her work was highly regarded by her contemporaries, and she received recognition in the Mercure de France.

== Selected works ==
- Traduction du théâtre anglois depuis l'origine des spectacles jusqu'à nos jours, divisée en trois époques, Paris, Veuve Ballard et fils, 12 vol., (with Cornélie Wouters), 1784–1787.
- Nelson, ou l'Avare puni, 3 vol., 1798.
