= Cornélie Wouters de Vassé =

Belgian writer

Cornélie-Pétronille-Bénédicte Wouters (October 14, 1737 – April 3, 1802), known as the baroness of Vassé, was a woman of letters known for her work as a translator in the 18th century.

== Biography ==
Cornélie Wouters de Vassé was born in Brussels, in what was then the Austrian Netherlands and is now Belgium, in 1737. She was one of at least seven children born to Jacques Corneille and Catherine Marguerite Wouters.

She moved to Paris after the death of her husband, the wealthy baron of Vassé, and it was there that she began to write and translate for a living in 1782. She often collaborated with her sister Marie Thérèse Wouters, who helped her translate works into French from English, including The British Plutarch by Thomas Mortimer.

In 1790, she became the only woman of the period to have contributed to the public debate over Jews' rights in France, producing a pamphlet in their defense. She argued they should be given full civil and political rights, without having to give up their religious beliefs.

She died in Paris in 1802.

== Selected works ==
=== Writing ===
- L’Art de corriger et de rendre les hommes constans (dialogue), 1782.
- Le Nouveau Continent (philosophical tale), 1783.
- Le Char volant, ou Voyage dans la lune (philosophical tale), 1783.

=== Translation ===
- Traduction du théâtre anglois depuis l’origine des spectacles jusqu’à nos jours, 12 vol., (with Marie Wouters) 1784–1787.
- La Vie des hommes illustres d’Angleterre, d’Écosse et d’Irlande, ou le Plutarque anglois, from Thomas Mortimer's The British Plutarch, 1785.
