= Michael Ewing Purves =

Michael Ewing Purves is the founder and Chief Executive Officer of Tallbacken Capital Advisors, LLC. Prior to starting Tallbacken, he was the Chief Global Strategist and Head of Equity Derivatives Strategy at Weeden & Co., where he provided commentary on equities, interest rates, FX precious metals, commodities and volatility. He is a regular guest on Bloomberg Television, CNBC, Business News Network, and Fox Business Network. He developed the "Wolf Market" framework, a view that the stock market can stay range bound and volatile for a protracted period of time (neither a bull or a bear market).

== Background ==
Purves received his BA at Columbia University where he was an architecture major and his MBA from the Wharton School of the University of Pennsylvania.

== Personal life ==
Purves currently resides in New York City.
