= Rally (stock market) =

Period of increases in security prices

A rally is a period of sustained increases in the prices of stocks, bonds or indices. This type of price movement can happen during either a bull or a bear market, when it is known as either a bull market rally or a bear market rally, respectively. However, a rally will generally follow a period of flat or declining prices.

An increase in prices during a primary trend bear market is called a bear market rally. A bear market rally is sometimes defined as an increase of 10% to 20%. Bear market rallies typically begin suddenly and are often short-lived. Notable bear market rallies occurred in the Dow Jones index after the 1929 stock market crash leading down to the market bottom in 1932, and throughout the late 1960s and early 1970s. The Japanese Nikkei 225 has been typified by a number of bear market rallies since the late 1980s while experiencing an overall long-term downward trend.

== See also ==
- Market trend
- Business cycle
- Trend following
