= Every Man His Own Broker =

1761 book on economics

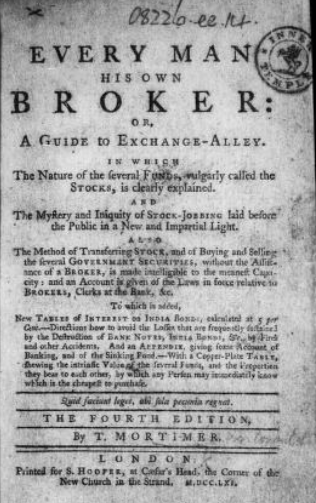
- Author: Thomas Mortimer
- Language: English
- Publication date: 1761
- Publication place: United Kingdom

Every Man His Own Broker; or A Guide to the Stock Exchange, is a book on economics by Thomas Mortimer, published in 1761, and enjoying 14 editions over the next four decades. It is considered one of the first books on guides to stock trading.

Mortimer traded at Jonathan's Coffee-House in Exchange Alley, which served as the country's stock exchange in 18th century London. He is often critical of some brokers and traders there, advising individuals to not depend on them.

In the book, Mortimer famously said:

A Bull is the name by which the gentlemen of 'Change Alley choose to call all persons who contract to buy any quantity of government securities, without an intention or ability to pay for it, and who consequently are obliged to sell it again, either at a profit or a loss, before the time comes when they have contracted to take it.

This refers to the former practice of stock-brokers, abolished circa 1980's in London, allowing their clients to trade on credit during a period of about two weeks, known as an account, on the completion of which all purchases and sales made during the account period had to be paid for on the settlement date. A net trading loss would result in the client having to make a cash payment to the broker.

By its 12th edition, the book had been translated into German, French, Dutch, and Spanish.
