= Market trend =

Perceived financial market movement tendency over time

A market trend is a perceived tendency of the financial markets to move in a particular direction over time. Analysts classify these trends as secular for long time-frames, primary for medium time-frames, and secondary for short time-frames. Traders attempt to identify market trends using technical analysis, a framework which characterizes market trends as predictable price tendencies within the market when price reaches support and resistance levels, varying over time.

A market trend can only be determined in hindsight, since at any time prices in the future are not known. This fact makes market timing inherently a game of educated guessing rather than a certainty. Past trends are identified by drawing lines, known as trendlines, that connect price action making higher highs and higher lows for an uptrend, or lower lows and lower highs for a downtrend.

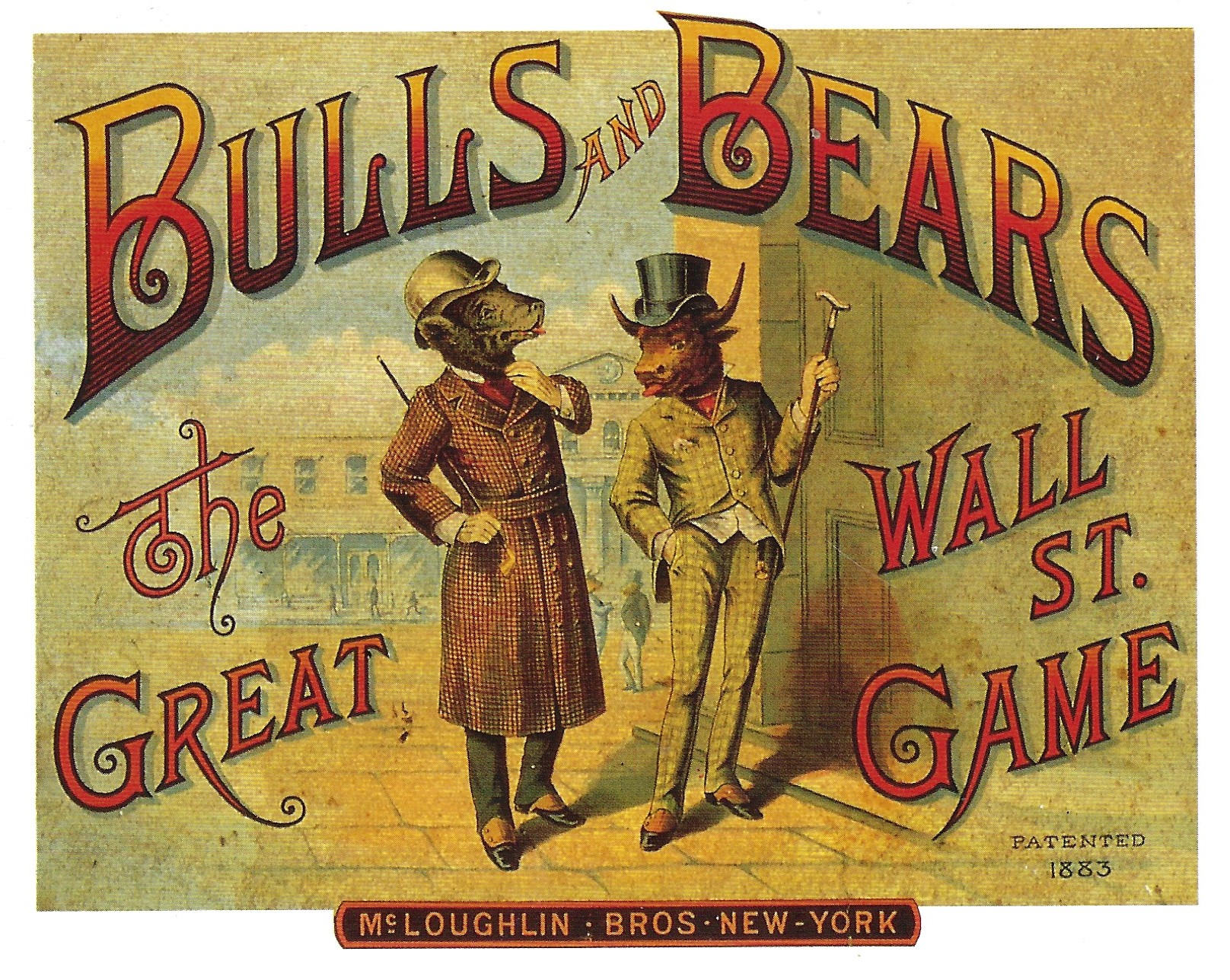
"Bulls and Bears: The Great Wall St. Game" was a board game published in 1883

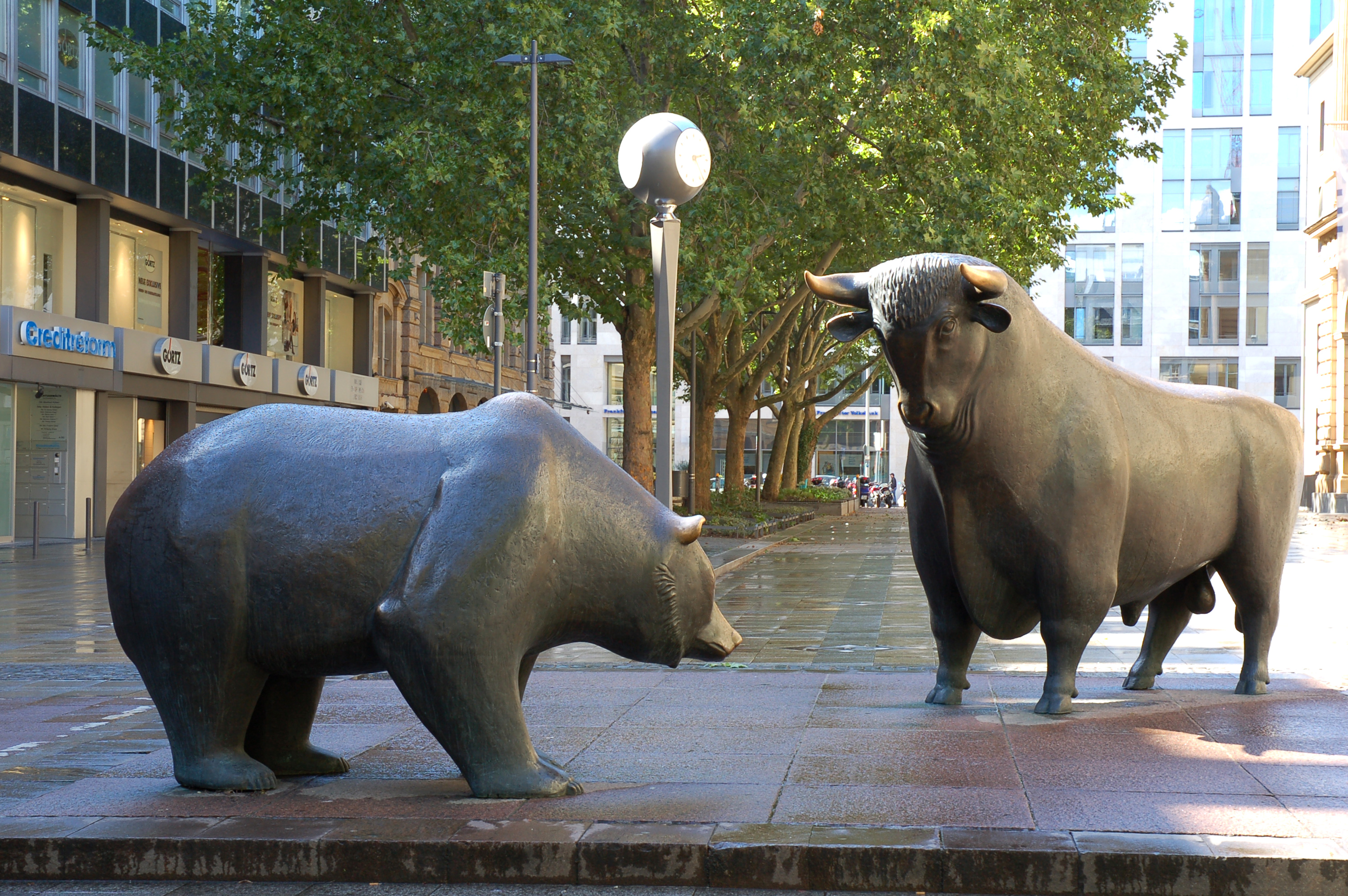
Statues of the two symbolic beasts of finance, the bear and the bull, in front of the Frankfurt Stock Exchange

== Market terminology ==
The terms "bull market" and "bear market" describe upward and downward market trends, respectively, and can be used to describe either the market as a whole or specific sectors and securities. The terms come from London's Exchange Alley in the early 18th century, where traders who engaged in naked short selling were called "bear-skin jobbers" because they sold a bear's skin (the shares) before catching the bear (the closing trade). This was simplified to "bears," while traders who bought shares on credit were called "bulls." The latter term might have originated by analogy to bear-baiting and bull-baiting, two animal fighting sports of the time. Thomas Mortimer recorded both terms in his 1761 book Every Man His Own Broker. He remarked that bulls who bought in excess of present demand might be seen wandering among brokers' offices moaning for a buyer, while bears rushed about devouring any shares they could find to close their short positions. An unrelated folk etymology supposes that the terms refer to a bear clawing downward to attack and a bull bucking upward with its horns.

== Secular trends ==
A secular market trend is a lasting long-term trend that lasts 5 to 25 years and consists of a series of primary trends. A secular bear market consists of smaller bull markets and larger bear markets; a secular bull market consists of larger bull markets and smaller bear markets.

In a secular bull market, the prevailing trend is "bullish" or upward-moving. The United States stock market was described as being in a secular bull market from about 1983 to 2000 (or 2007), with brief upsets including Black Monday and the Stock market downturn of 2002, triggered by the crash of the dot-com bubble. Another example is the 2000s commodities boom.

In a secular bear market, the prevailing trend is "bearish" or downward-moving. An example of a secular bear market occurred in gold from January 1980 to June 1999, culminating with the Brown Bottom. During this period, the market price of gold fell from a high of $850/oz ($30/g) to a low of $253/oz ($9/g). The stock market was also described as being in a secular bear market from 1929 to 1949.

== Primary trends ==
A primary trend has broad support throughout the entire market, across most sectors, and lasts for a year or more.

=== Bull market ===
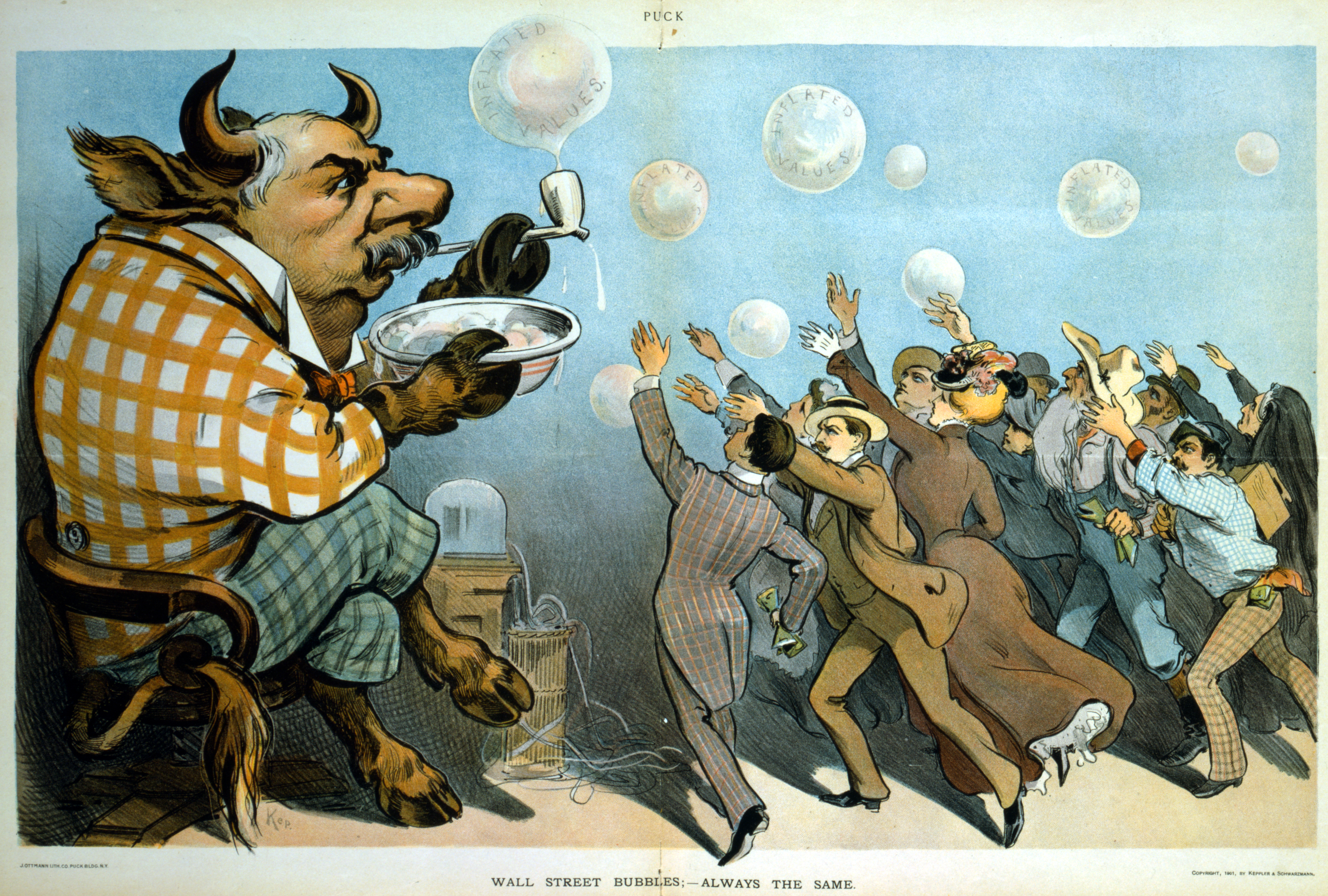
A 1901 cartoon depicting financier J. P. Morgan as a bull with eager investors

A bull market is a period of generally rising prices. The start of a bull market is marked by widespread pessimism. This point is when the "crowd" is the most "bearish". The feeling of despondency changes to hope, "optimism", and eventually euphoria as the bull runs its course. This often leads the economic cycle, for example, in a full recession, or earlier.

Generally, bull markets begin when stocks rise 20% from their low and end when stocks experience a 20% drawdown. However, some analysts suggest a bull market cannot happen within a bear market.

An analysis of Morningstar, Inc. stock market data from 1926 to 2014 revealed that, on average, a typical bull market lasted 8.5 years with a cumulative total return averaging 458%. Additionally, annualized gains for bull markets ranged from 14.9% to 34.1%.

==== Examples ====
- India's Bombay Stock Exchange Index, BSE SENSEX, experienced a major bull market trend from April 2003 to January 2008. It increased from 2,900 points to 21,000 points, representing a more than 600% return in 5 years.
- Notable bull markets characterized the 1925–1929, 1953–1957, and 1993–1997 periods when the U.S. and many other stock markets experienced significant growth. While the first period ended abruptly with the start of the Great Depression, the end of the later time periods were mostly periods of soft landing, which became large bear markets. (see: Recession of 1960–61 and the dot-com bubble in 2000–2001)

=== Bear market ===
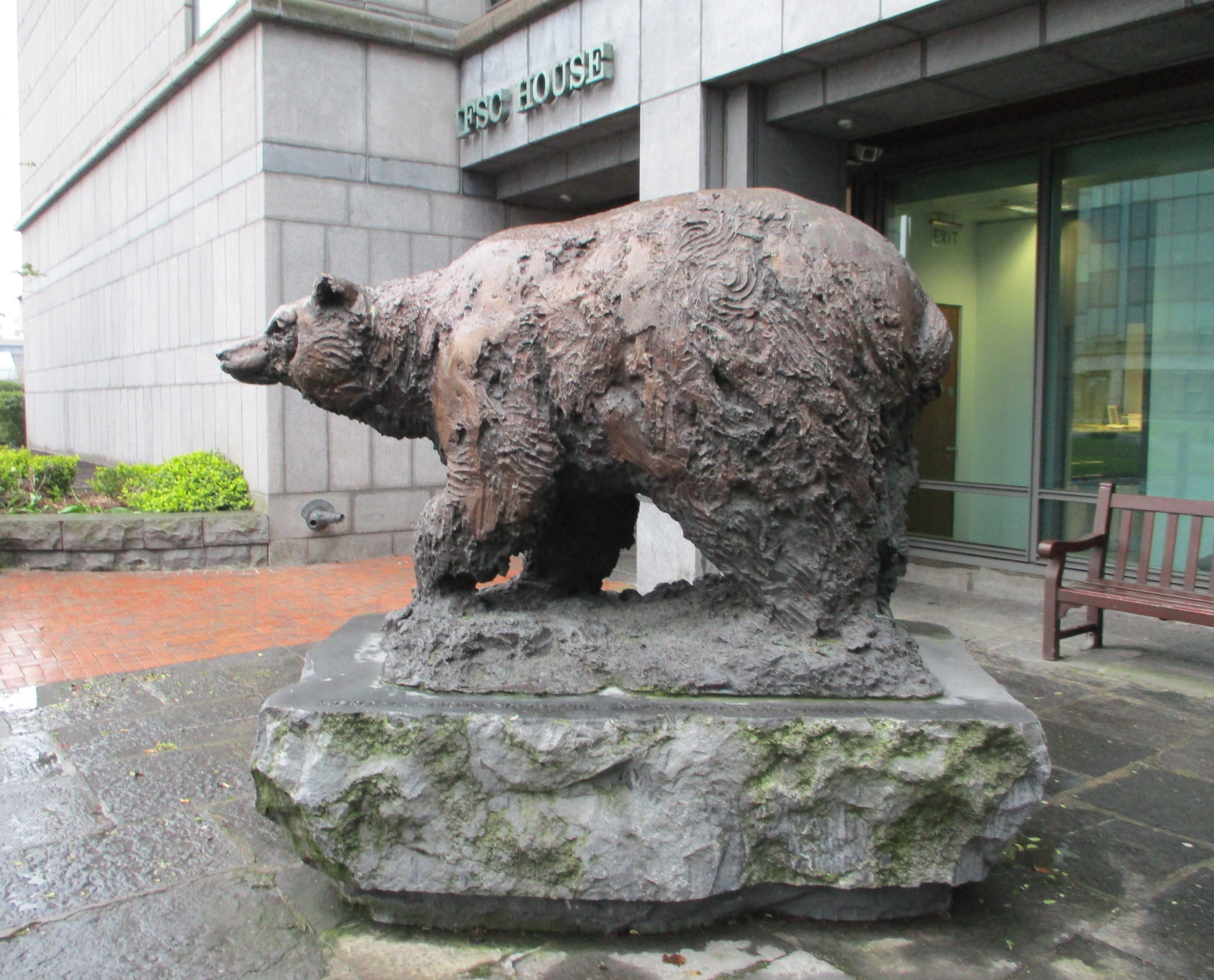
Sculpture of stock market bear outside International Financial Services Centre, Dublin

A bear market is a general decline in the stock market over a period of time. It involves a transition from high investor optimism to widespread investor fear and pessimism. One generally accepted measure of a bear market is a price decline of 20% or more over at least a two-month period.

A decline of 10% to 20% is classified as a correction.

Bear territory always precedes a bear market. Typically, as a market enters bear territory, there are indicators other than a correction. The Cboe Volatility Index (VIX), a key measure of market volatility, increases, indicating heightened investor anxiety. Additionally, consumer sentiment drops, with expectations for unemployment rising and economic outlooks declining. Most recently (as of April 12, 2025), in April 2025, the United States stock market entered bear territory. The S&P 500 Index declined over 20% from its recent peak, meeting the technical definition of entering bear territory. This downturn is primarily attributed to escalating trade tensions and tariff policies under the Trump administration, which have led to significant market volatility and investor uncertainty. Ultimately, when a market enters bear territory, it almost always leads that stock market into a bear market.

Bear markets conclude when stocks recover, reaching new highs. The bear market is then assessed retrospectively from the recent highs to the lowest closing price, and its recovery period spans from the lowest closing price to the attainment of new highs. Another commonly accepted indicator of the end of a bear market is indices gaining 20% or more from their low.

From 1926 to 2014, the average duration of a bear market was 13 months, accompanied by an average cumulative loss of 30%. Annualized declines for bear markets ranged from −19.7% to −47%.

==== Examples ====
Some examples of a bear market include:

- The Wall Street Crash of 1929, which erased 89% (from 386 to 40) of the Dow Jones Industrial Average's market capitalization by July 1932, marking the start of the Great Depression. After regaining nearly 50% of its losses, a longer bear market from 1937 to 1942 occurred in which the market was again cut in half.
- A long-term bear market occurred from about 1973 to 1982, encompassing the 1970s energy crisis and the high unemployment of the early 1980s.
- A bear market occurred in India following the 1992 Indian stock market scam committed by Harshad Mehta.
- The Stock market downturn of 2002.
- Due to the 2008 financial crisis, a bear market occurred between October 2007 and March 2009.
- The 2015 Chinese stock market crash.
- In early 2020, the COVID-19 pandemic caused multiple stock market crashes, leading to bear markets across the world.
- In 2022, concerns over an inflation surge and potential rises of the federal funds rate caused a bear market.

=== Market top ===
A market top (or market high) is usually not a dramatic event. The market has simply reached the highest point that it will, for some time. This identification is retrospective, as market participants are generally unaware of it when it occurs. Thus prices subsequently fall, either slowly or more rapidly.

According to William O'Neil, since the 1950s, a market top is characterized by three to five distribution days in a major stock market index occurring within a relatively short period of time. Distribution is identified as a decline in price with higher volume than the preceding session.

==== Examples ====
The peak of the dot-com bubble, as measured by the NASDAQ-100, occurred on March 24, 2000, when the index closed at 4,704.73. The Nasdaq peaked at 5,132.50 and the S&P 500 Index at 1525.20.

The peak of the U.S. stock market before the 2008 financial crisis occurred on October 9, 2007. The S&P 500 closed at 1,565 and the NASDAQ at 2,861.50.

=== Market bottom ===
A market bottom marks a trend reversal, signifying the end of a market downturn and the commencement of an upward-moving trend (bull market).

Identifying a market bottom, often referred to as 'bottom picking,' is a challenging task, as it's difficult to recognize before it passes. The upturn following a decline may be short-lived, and prices might resume their descent, resulting in a loss for the investor who purchased stocks during a misperceived or 'false' market bottom.

Baron Rothschild is often quoted as advising that the best time to buy is when there is 'blood in the streets'—that is, when the markets have fallen drastically and investor sentiment is extremely negative.

==== Examples ====
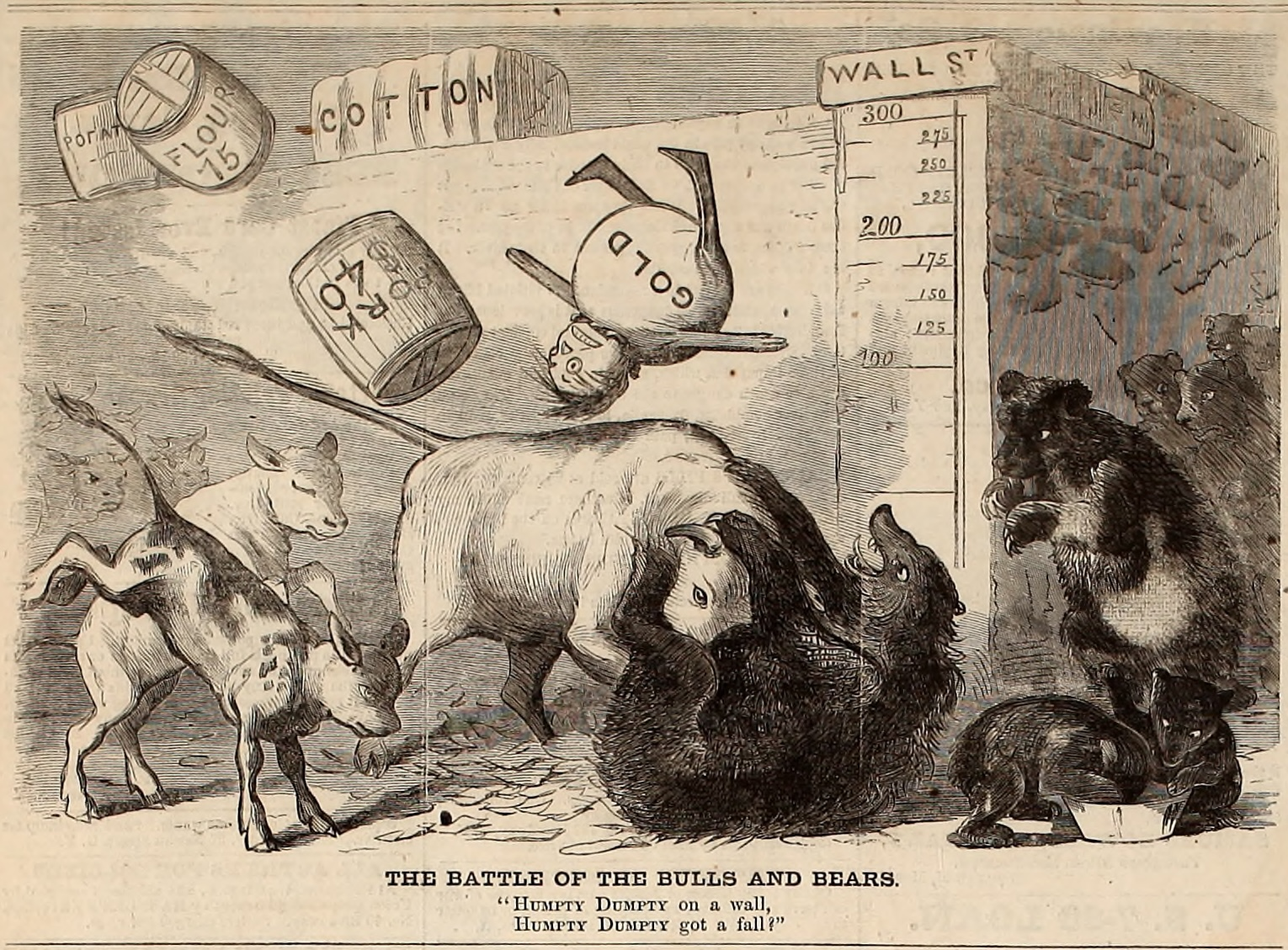
The Battle of the Bulls and Bears (Harper's Weekly, September 10, 1864)

Some more examples of market bottoms, in terms of the closing values of the Dow Jones Industrial Average (DJIA) include:

- The Dow Jones Industrial Average hit a bottom at 1,738.74 on October 19, 1987, following a decline from 2,722.41 on August 25, 1987. This day is commonly referred to as Black Monday (chart).
- A bottom of 7,286.27 was reached on the DJIA on October 9, 2002, following a decline from 11,722.98 on January 14, 2000. This decline included an intermediate bottom of 8,235.81 on September 21, 2001 (a 14% change from September 10), leading to an intermediate top of 10,635.25 on March 19, 2002 (chart). Meanwhile, the "tech-heavy" Nasdaq experienced a more precipitous fall, declining 79% from its peak of 5,132 on March 10, 2000, to its bottom of 1,108 on October 10, 2002.
- A bottom of 6,440.08 (DJIA) on 9 March 2009 was reached after a decline associated with the subprime mortgage crisis starting at 14164.41 on 9 October 2007 (chart).

== Secondary trends ==
Secondary trends are short-term changes in price direction within a primary trend, typically lasting for a few weeks or a few months.

=== Bear market rally ===
Similarly, a bear market rally, sometimes referred to as a 'sucker's rally' or 'dead cat bounce', is characterized by a price increase of 5% or more before prices fall again. Bear market rallies were observed in the Dow Jones Industrial Average index after the Wall Street Crash of 1929, leading down to the market bottom in 1932, and throughout the late 1960s and early 1970s. The Japanese Nikkei 225 has had several bear-market rallies between the 1980s and 2011, while undergoing an overall long-term downward trend.

== Causes of market trends ==
The price of assets, such as stocks, is determined by supply and demand. By definition, the market balances buyers and sellers, making it impossible to have 'more buyers than sellers' or vice versa, despite the common use of that expression. During a surge in demand, buyers are willing to pay higher prices, while sellers seek higher prices in return. Conversely, in a surge in supply, the dynamics are reversed.

Supply and demand dynamics vary as investors attempt to reallocate their investments between asset types. For instance, investors may seek to move funds from government bonds to 'tech' stocks, but the success of this shift depends on finding buyers for the government bonds they are selling. Conversely, they might aim to move funds from 'tech' stocks to government bonds at another time. In each case, these actions influence the prices of both asset types.

Ideally, investors aim to use market timing to buy low and sell high, but in practice, they may end up buying high and selling low. Contrarian investors and traders employ a strategy of 'fading' investors' actions—buying when others are selling and selling when others are buying. A period when most investors are selling stocks is known as distribution, while a period when most investors are buying stocks is known as accumulation.

"According to standard theory, a decrease in price typically leads to less supply and more demand, while an increase in price has the opposite effect. While this principle holds true for many assets, it often operates in reverse for stocks due to the common mistake made by investors—buying high in a state of euphoria and selling low in a state of fear or panic, driven by the herding instinct. In cases where an increase in price leads to an increase in demand, or a decrease in price leads to an increase in supply, the expected negative feedback loop is disrupted, resulting in price instability. This phenomenon is evident in bubbles or market crashes.

== Market sentiment ==
Market sentiment is a contrarian stock market indicator.

When an extremely high proportion of investors express a bearish (negative) sentiment, some analysts consider it to be a strong signal that a market bottom may be near. David Hirshleifer observes a trend phenomenon that follows a path starting with under-reaction and culminating in overreaction by investors and traders.

Indicators that measure investor sentiment may include:

- The Investor Intelligence Sentiment Index evaluates market sentiment through the Bull-Bear spread (% of Bulls − % of Bears). A close-to-historic-low spread may signal a bottom, indicating a potential market turnaround. Conversely, an extreme high in bullish sentiment and an extreme low in bearish sentiment may suggest a market top or an imminent occurrence. This contrarian measure is more reliable for coincidental timing at market lows than at market tops.
- The American Association of Individual Investors (AAII) sentiment indicator is often interpreted to suggest that the majority of the decline has already occurred when it gives a reading of minus 15% or below.
- Other sentiment indicators include the Nova-Ursa ratio, the Short Interest/Total Market Float, and the put/call ratio.

== See also ==
- Animal spirits
- Black Monday
- Bull-bear line
- Business cycle
- Don't fight the tape
- Economic Cycle Research Institute
- Economic expansion
- Herd mentality
- Market sentiment
- Michael Ewing Purves, developed the "Wolf Market" framework
- Mr. Market
- Real estate trends
- Recession
- Trend following
