= Retail format =

Types of business establishment

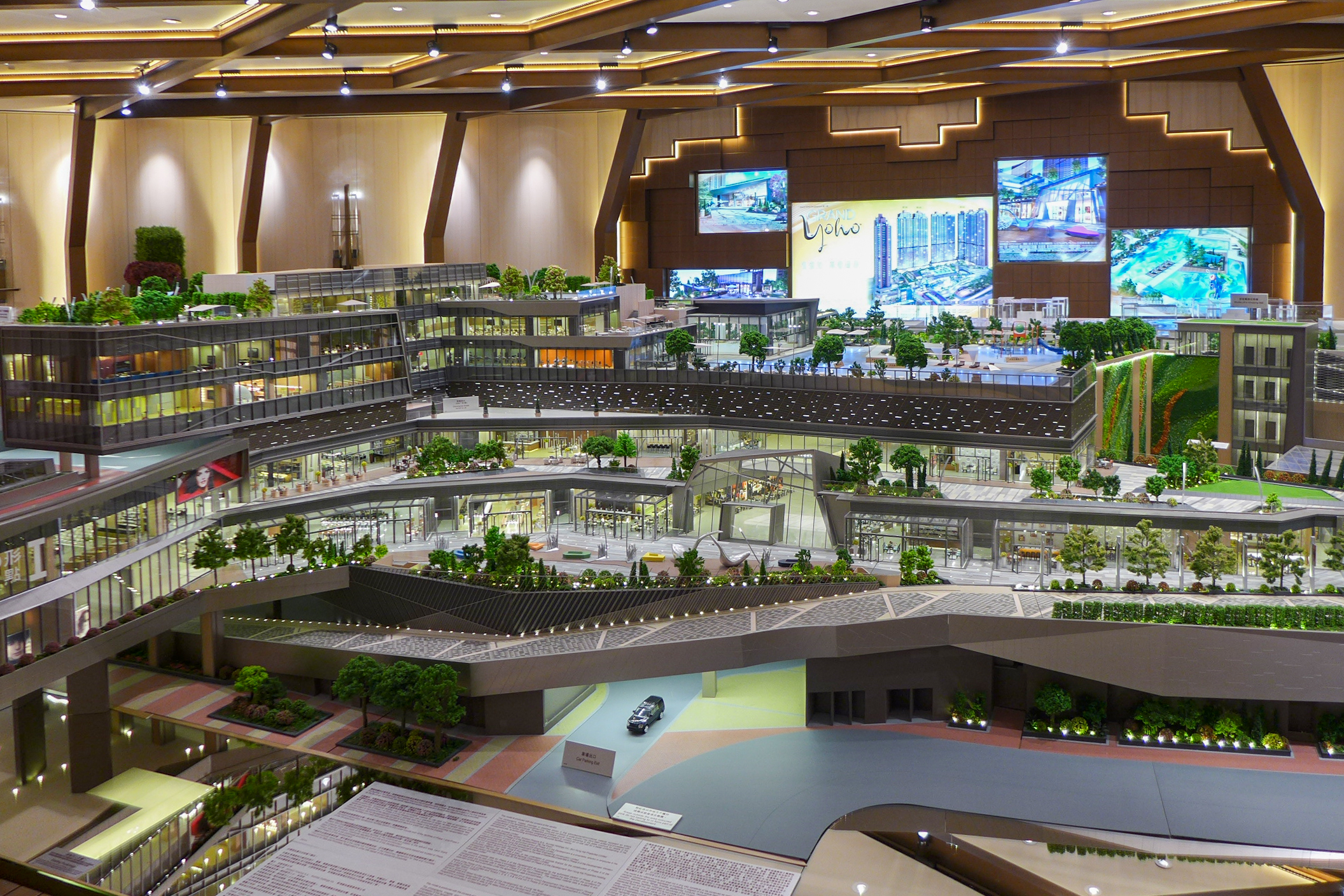
This model shows a plan for the Grand Yoho development in Yuen Long District, Hong Kong, a large shopping mall, one of the various retail formats.

The retail format (also known as the retail formula) influences the consumer's store choice and addresses the consumer's expectations. At its most basic level, a retail format is a simple marketplace, that is; a location where goods and services are exchanged. In some parts of the world, the retail sector is still dominated by small family-run stores, but large retail chains are increasingly dominating the sector, because they can exert considerable buying power and pass on the savings in the form of lower prices. Many of these large retail chains also produce their own private labels, which compete alongside manufacturer brands. Considerable consolidation of retail stores has changed the retail landscape, transferring power away from wholesalers and into the hands of the large retail chains.

In Britain and Europe, the retail sale of goods is designated as a service activity. The European Service Directive applies to all retail trade, including periodic markets, street traders and peddlers.

== Retail type by product ==
Retail stores may be classified by the type of product carried:

Food retailers carrying highly perishable items such as meat, dairy, and fresh produce typically require cold storage facilities. Consumers purchase food products on a very regular purchase cycle – e.g. daily, weekly, or monthly.

Softline retailers sell goods that are consumed after a single-use, or have a limited life (typically under three years), in which they are normally consumed. Soft goods include clothing, other fabrics, footwear, toiletries, cosmetics, medicines and stationery.

Grocery stores (including supermarkets and hypermarkets) and convenience stores carry a variety of food products and consumable household items such as detergents, cleansers, and personal hygiene products. Consumer consumables are collectively known as fast-moving-consumer goods (FMCG) and represent the lines most often carried by supermarkets, grocers, and convenience stores. For consumers, these are regular purchases, and for the retailer, these products represent high-turnover product lines. Grocery stores and convenience stores carry similar lines, but a convenience store (staffed or automated) is often open at times that suit its clientele and may be located for ease of access.

Retailers selling consumer durables are sometimes known as hardline retailers – automobiles, appliances, electronics, furniture, sporting goods, lumber, etc., and parts for them. Goods that do not quickly wear out and provide utility over time. For the consumer, these items often represent major purchase decisions. Consumers purchase durables over longer purchase decision cycles. For instance, the typical consumer might replace their family car every 5 years, and their home computer every 4 years.

Specialist retailers operate in many industries such as the arts e.g. green grocers, contemporary art galleries, bookstores, handicrafts, musical instruments, gift shops.

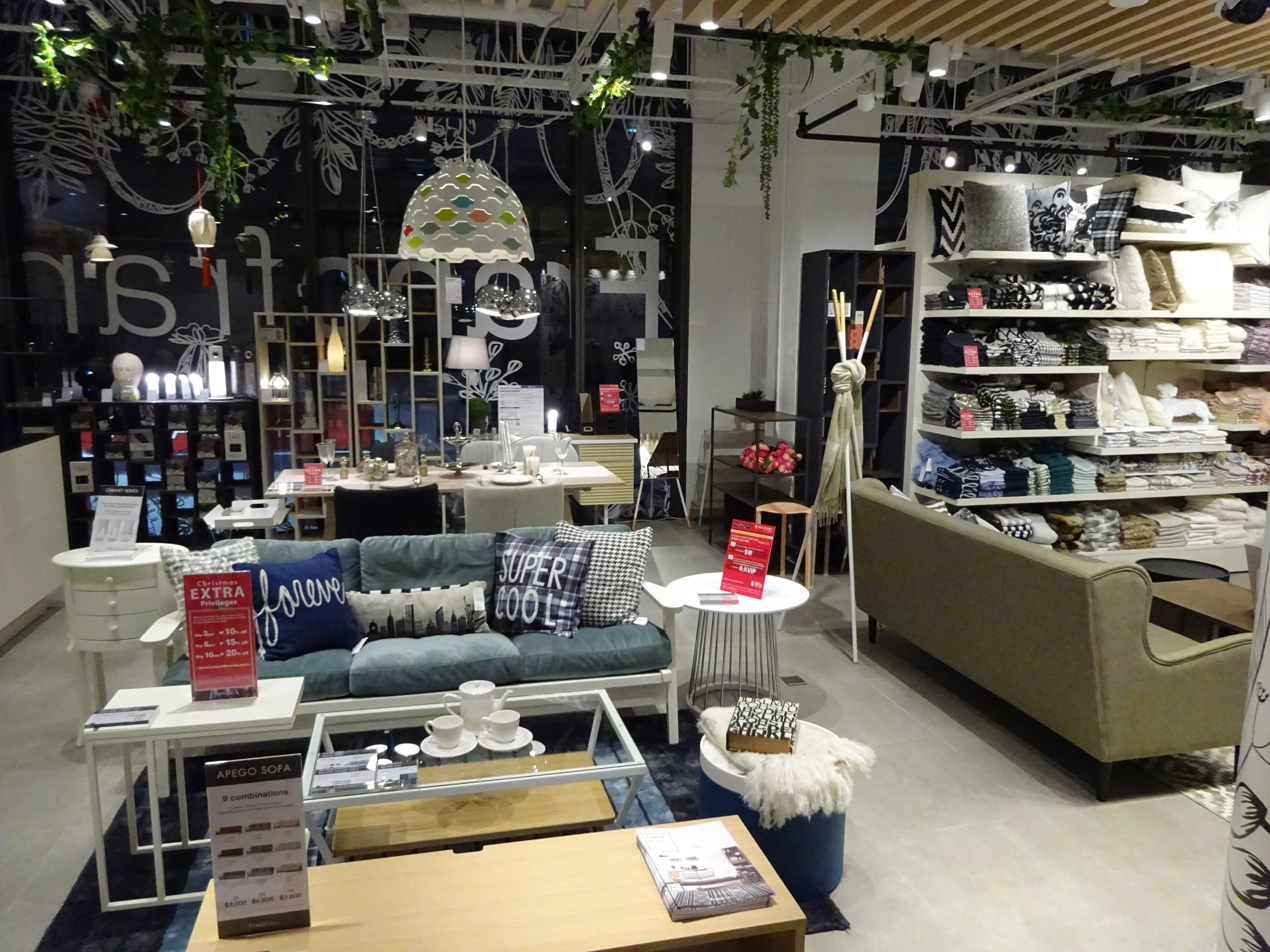
Furniture and homewares retailers are said to be hardline retailers. Pictured Furniture retailer in Hong Kong

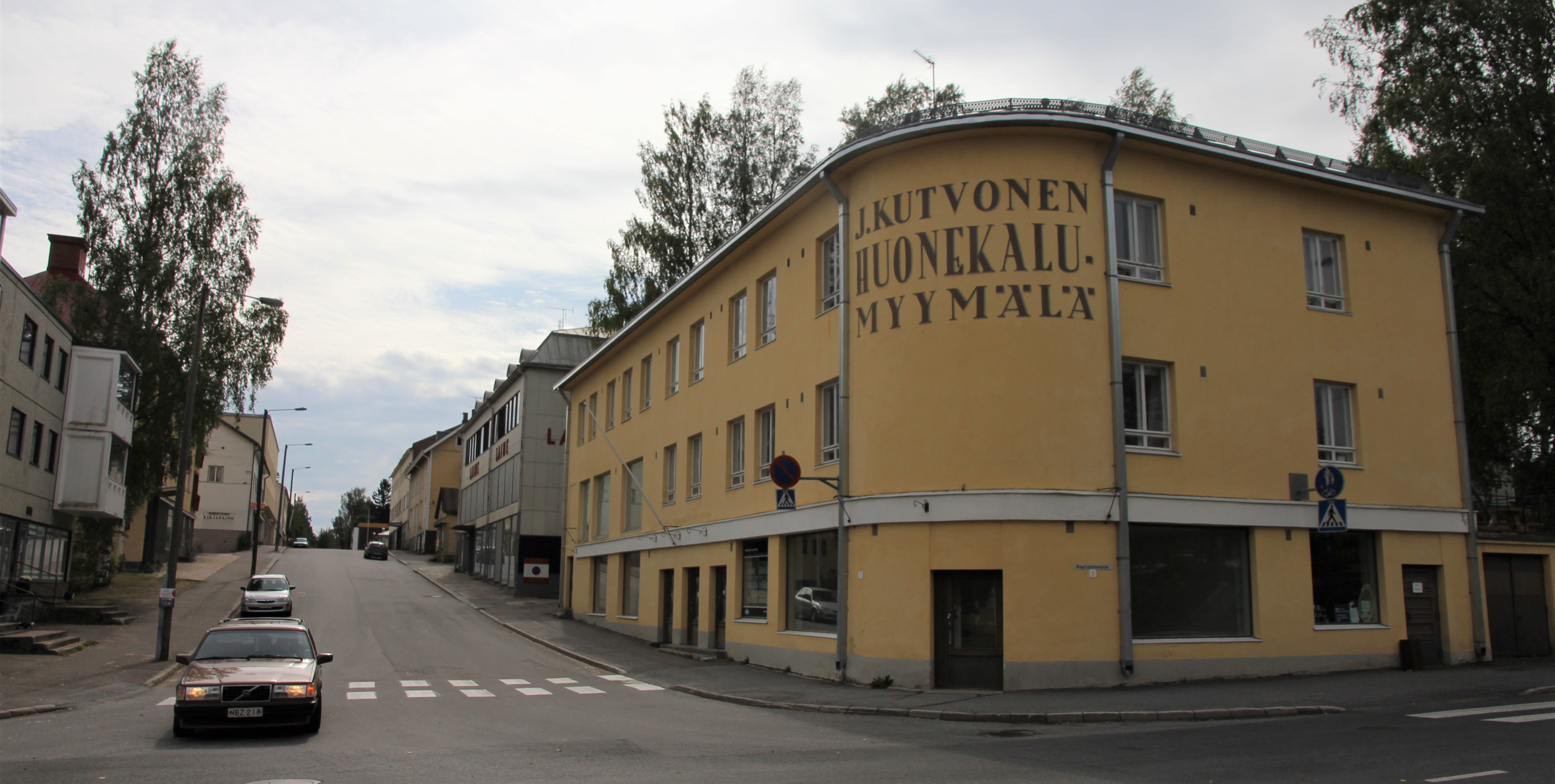
J. Kutvonen Huonekalumyymälä, a furniture retailer in Suonenjoki, North Savo, Finland

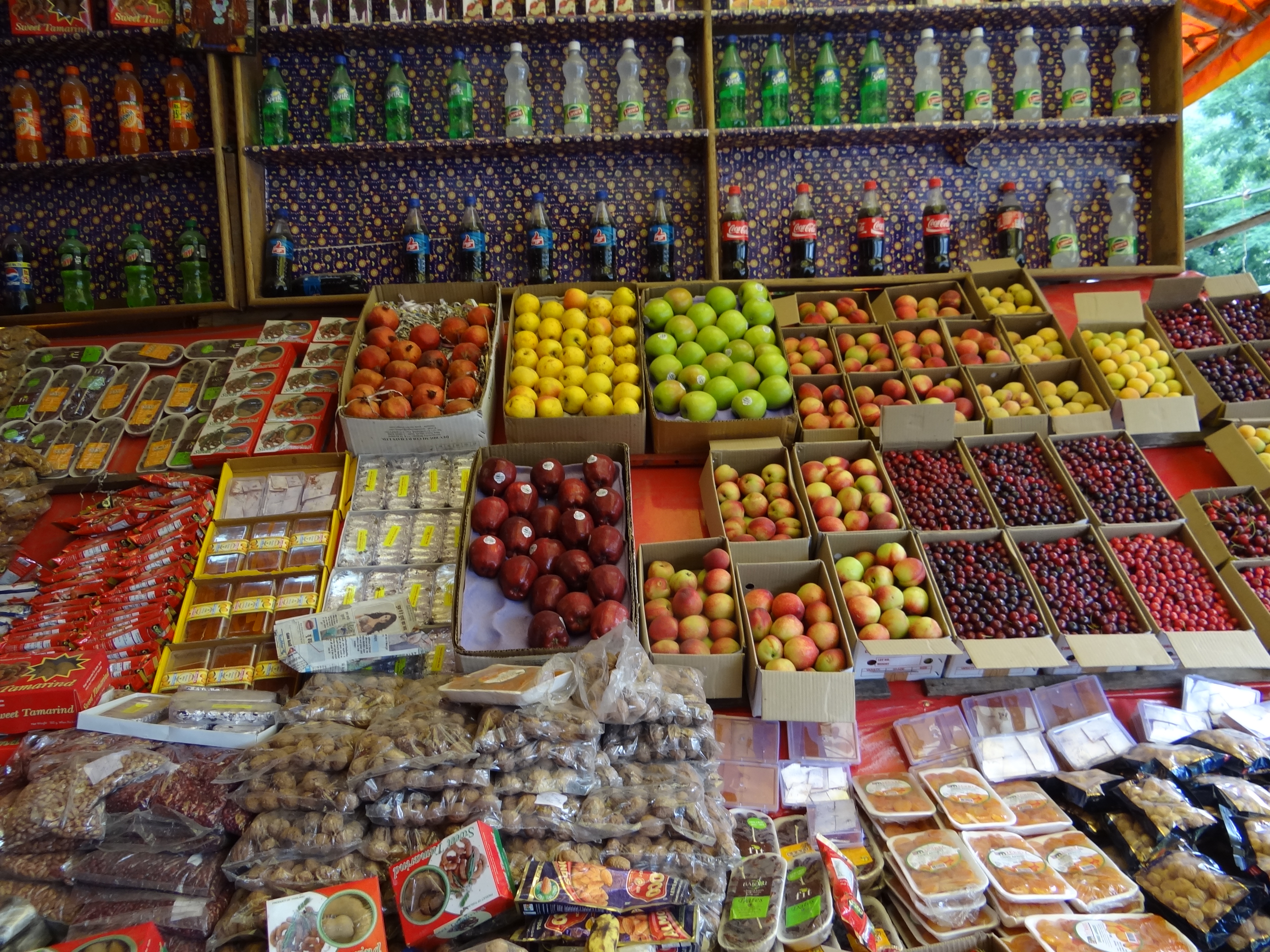
Food retailer – a fruit shop in Naggar, Himachal Pradesh, India

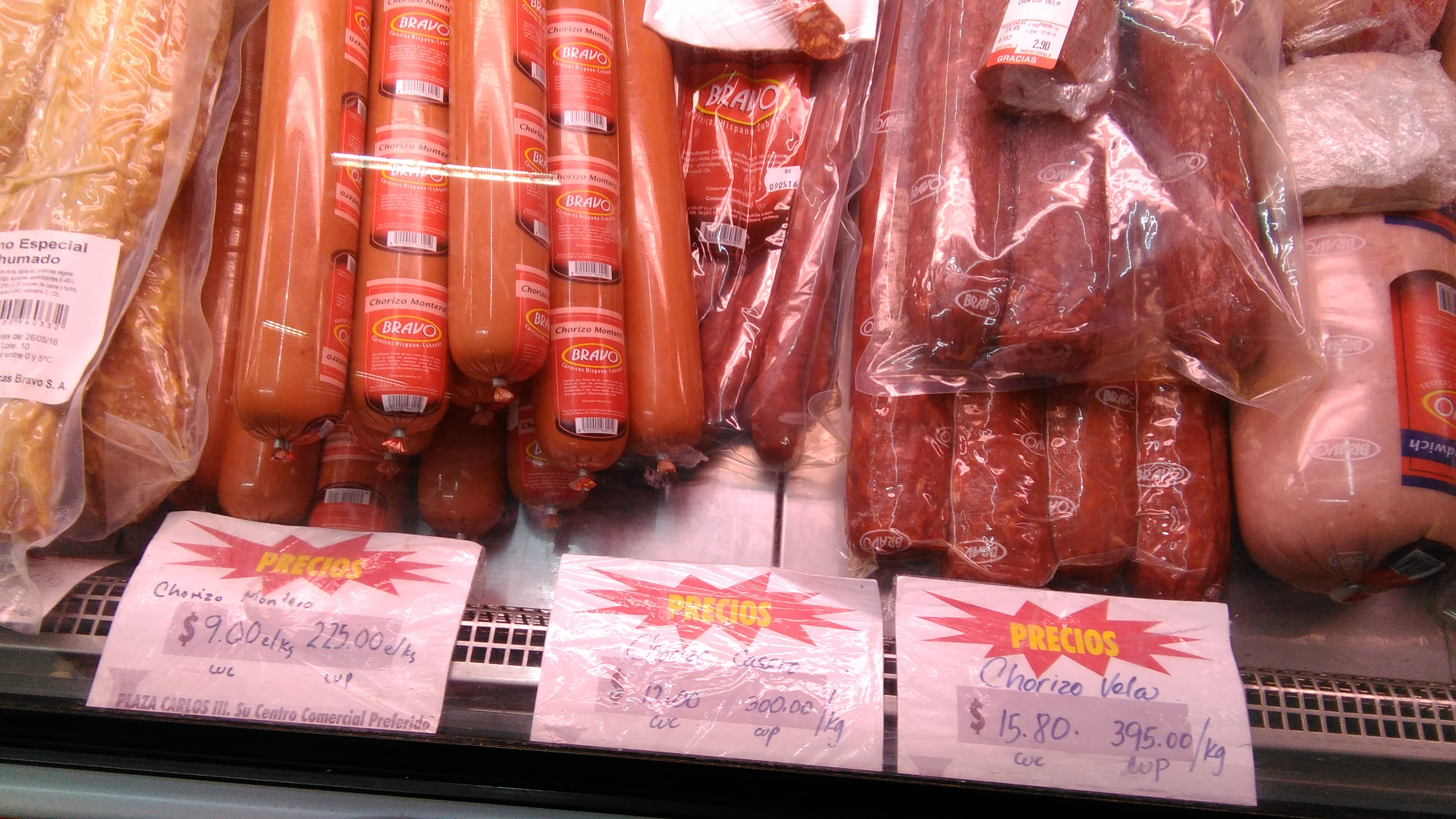
Food retail includes charcuteries, butcheries, delicatessens, green groceries, provedores, etc.

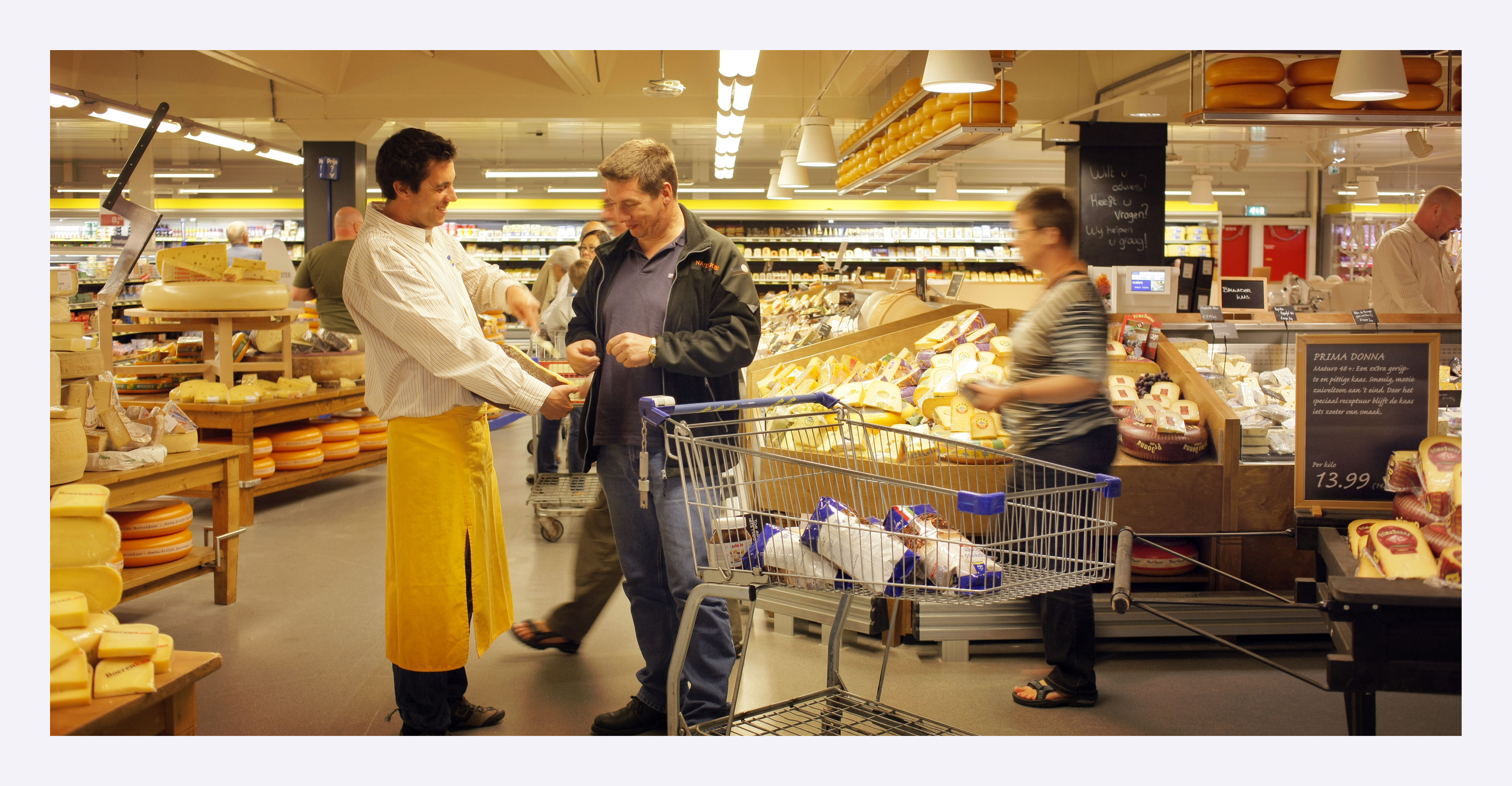
Kaaswereld, a specialist cheese store in the Netherlands

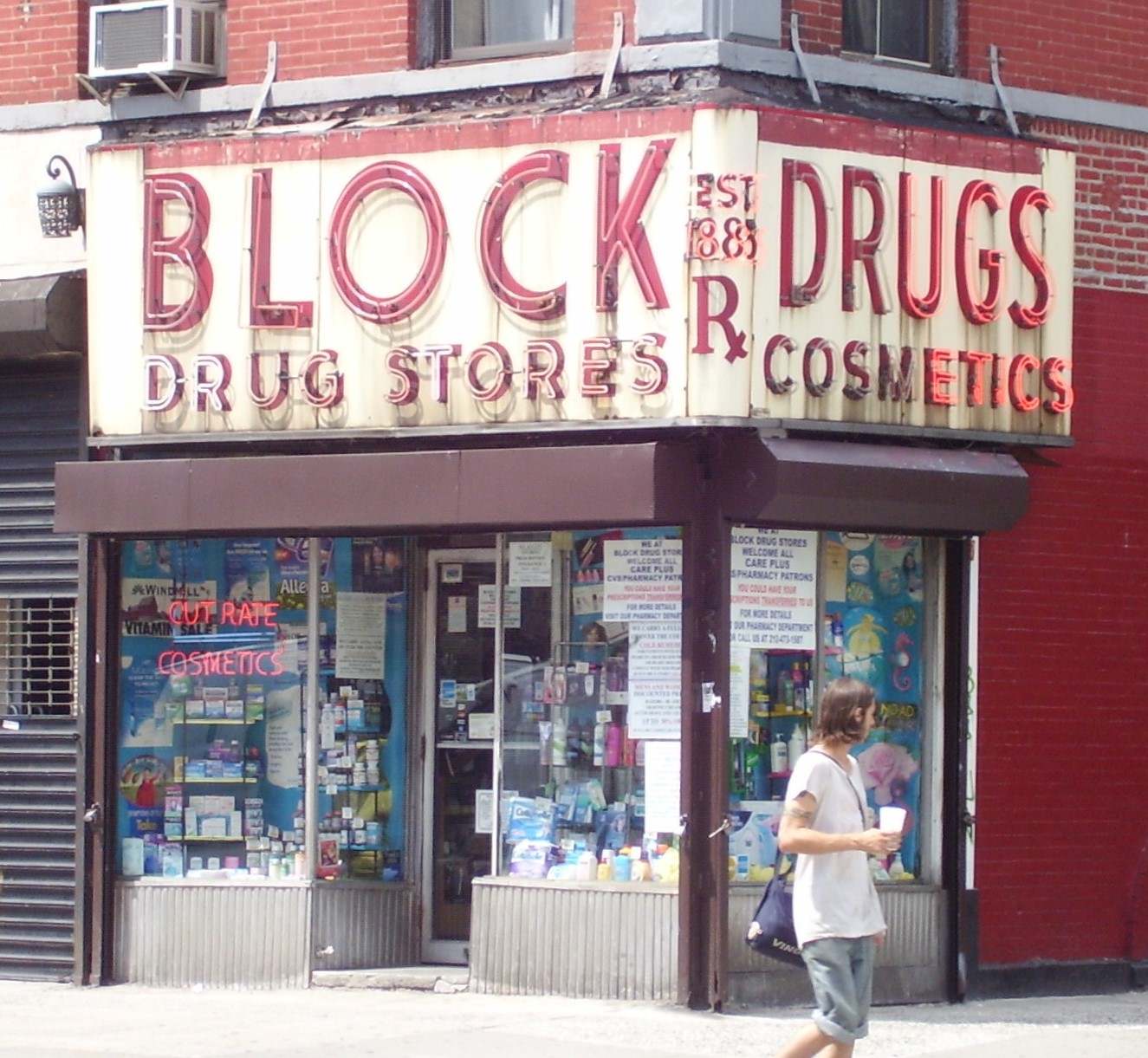
Stores that sell consumables are known as softline retailers.

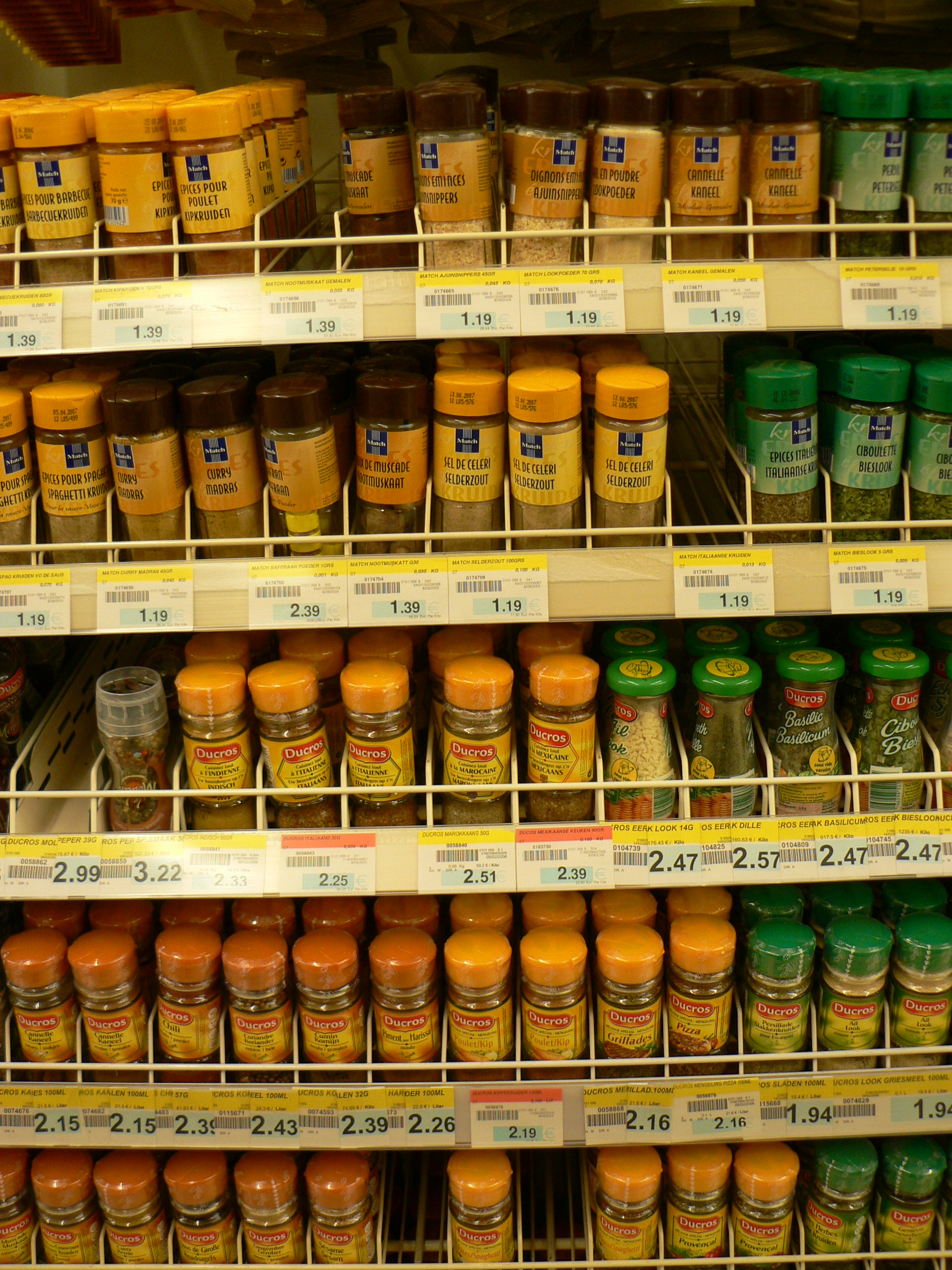
Stores that sell a mix of perishable and consumable goods to cater to household needs are known as grocery stores.

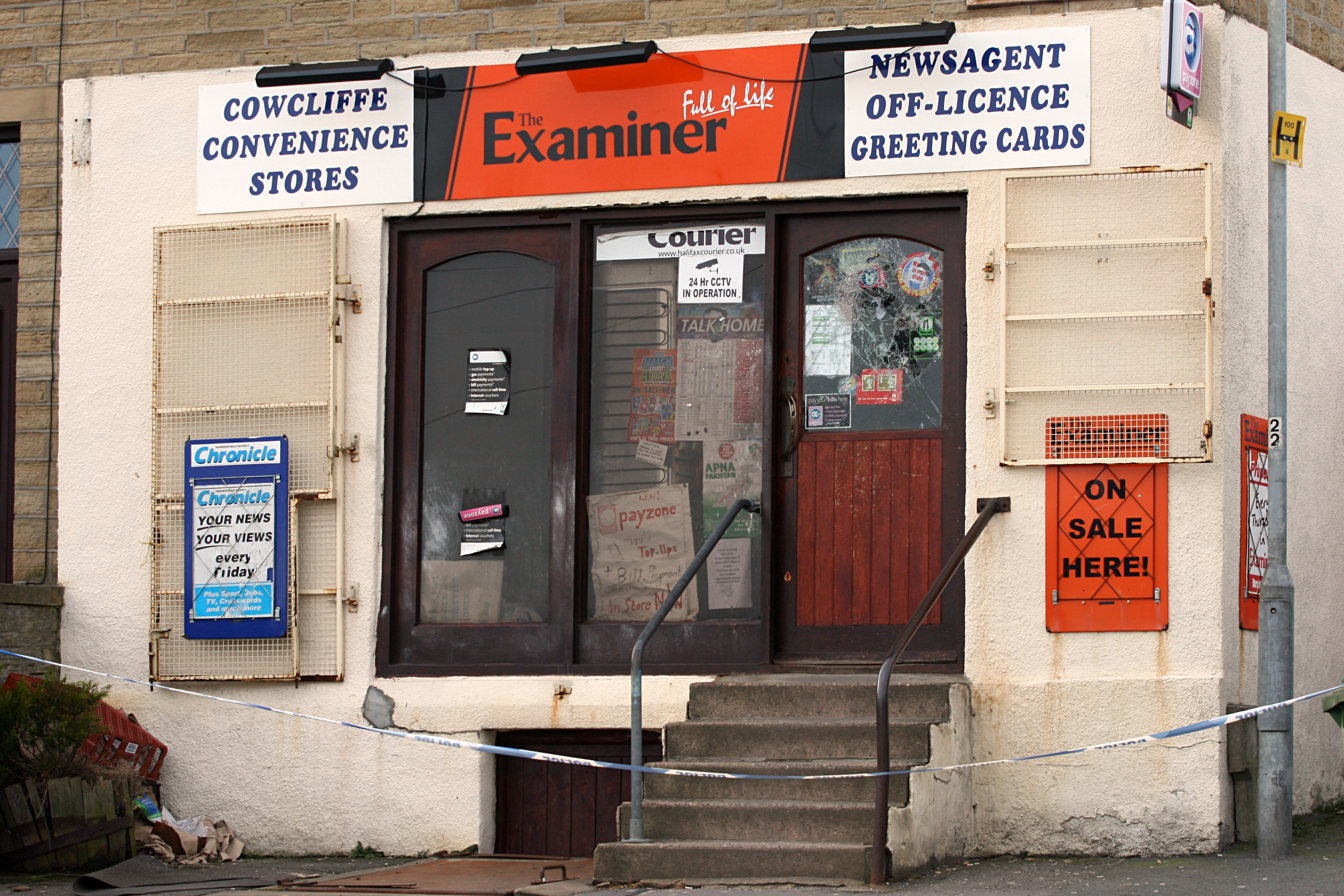
A store that retails a mix of household needs and is open long hours is a convenience store.

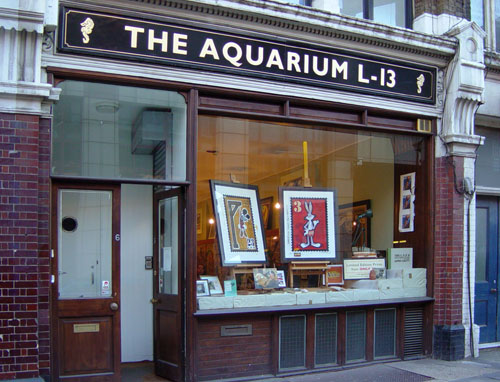
An art gallery is a specialist retailer.

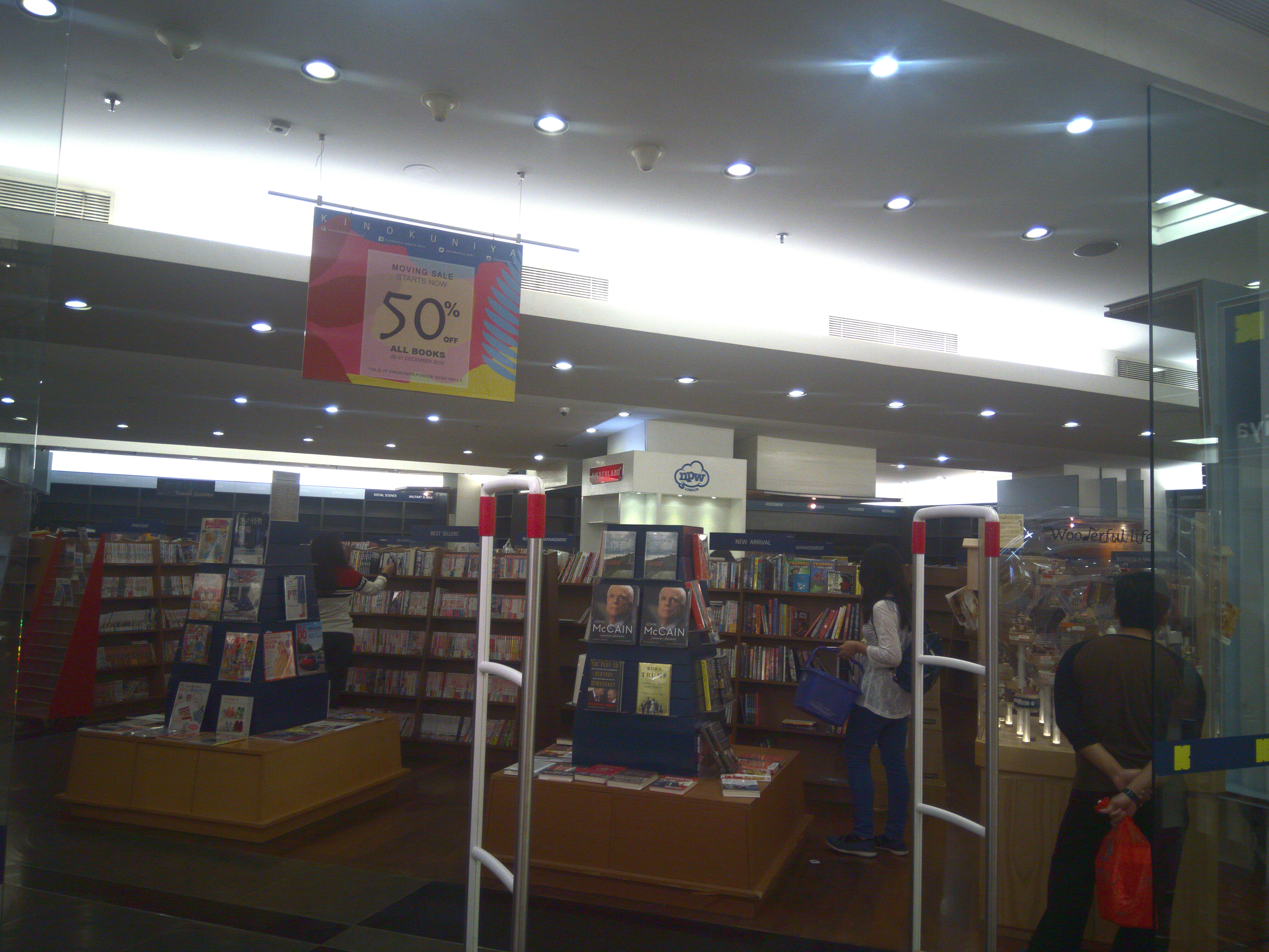
A bookstore is another example of a specialist retailer.

== Retail types by marketing strategy ==
Types of retail outlets (retail shops, retail stores) by marketing strategy include:

=== Arcade ===
A shopping arcade refers to a group of retail outlets operating under a covered walkway. Arcades are similar to shopping malls, although they typically comprise a smaller number of outlets. Shopping arcades were the evolutionary precursor to the shopping mall, and were very fashionable in the late 19th century. Stylish men and women would promenade around the arcade, stopping to window shop, making purchases, and also taking light refreshments in one of the arcade's tea-rooms.

Arcades offered fashionable men and women opportunities to 'be seen' and to socialise in a relatively safe environment. Arcades continue to exist as a distinct type of retail outlet. Historic 19th-century arcades have become popular tourist attractions in cities around the world. Amusement arcades, also known as penny arcades in the US, is more modern incarnation of the eighteenth and nineteenth century shopping arcades.

=== Anchor store ===
An anchor store (also known as a draw tenant or anchor tenant) is a larger store with a good reputation used by shopping mall management to attract a certain volume of shoppers to a precinct.

=== Automated store ===
Automated retail stores – self-service, robotic kiosks located in airports, malls, and grocery stores. The stores accept credit cards and are usually open 24/7. Examples include ZoomShops and Redbox.

=== Bazaar ===
The term bazaar can have multiple meanings. It may refer to Middle-Eastern marketplaces, while a penny bazaar is a retail outlet that specialises in inexpensive or discounted merchandise. In the United States, a bazaar can mean a "rummage sale" which describes a charity fundraising event held by a church or other community organization, and in which donated used goods are made available for sale.

=== Big-box store ===
Big-box stores – encompass larger department, discount, general merchandise, and warehouse stores.

=== Boutique ===
A boutique is a small store offering a select range of fashionable goods or accessories. The term boutique, in retail and services, appears to be taking on a broader meaning with popular references to retail goods and retail services such as boutique hotels, boutique or craft beers, boutique investments etc.

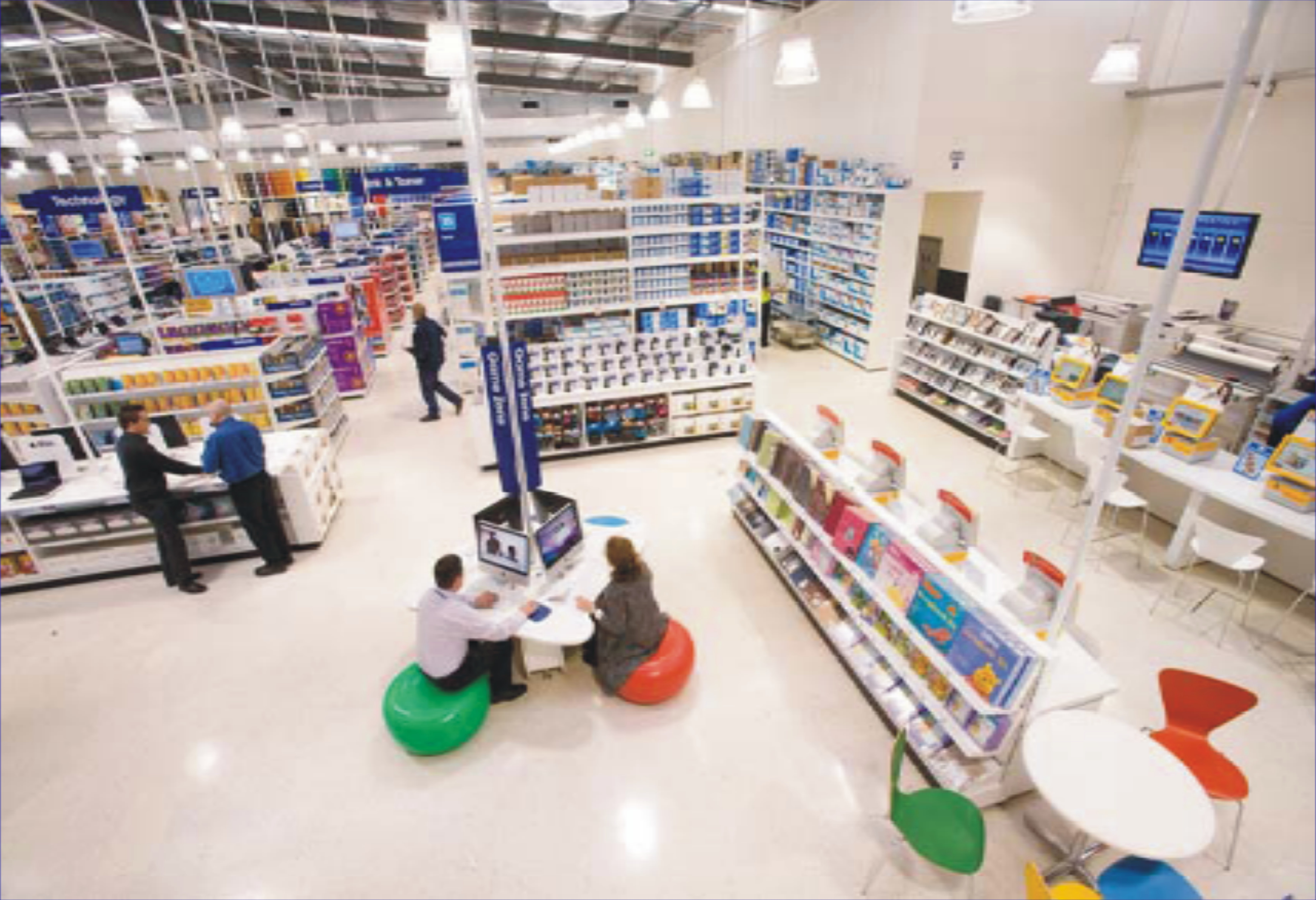
Australia's Officeworks is a category killer, retailing everything for the home office or small commercial office; stationery, furniture, electronics, communications devices, copying, printing and photography services, coffee, tea and light snacks.

Shoppy shops are upscale boutiques typically specializing in gourmet pantry.

=== Category killer ===
By supplying a wide assortment in a single category for lower prices, a category killer retailer can "kill" that category for other retailers. A category killer is a specialist store that dominates a given category. Toys "R" Us, established in 1957, is thought to be the first category killer, dominating the children's toys and games market. For a few categories, such as electronics, home hardware, office supplies and children's toys, the products are displayed at the centre of the store and a sales person will be available to address customer queries and give suggestions when required.

Rival retail stores are forced to reduce their prices if a category killer enters the market in a given geographic area. Examples of category killers include Toys "R" Us and Australia's Bunnings (hardware, DIY, and outdoor supplies) and Officeworks (stationery and supplies for the home office and small office). Some category killers redefine the category. For example, Australia's Bunnings began as a hardware outlet, but now supplies a broad range of goods for the home handyman or small tradesman, including kitchen cabinetry, craft supplies, gardening needs, and outdoor furniture. Similarly, Officeworks straddles the boundary between stationery supplies, office furniture, and digital communications devices in its quest to provide for all the needs of the retail consumer and the small home office.

=== Chain store ===
Chain store is one of a series of stores owned by the same company and selling the same or similar merchandise. Chain stores aim to benefit from volume buying discounts (economies of scale) and achieve cost savings through economies of scope (e.g., centralised warehousing, marketing, promotion, and administration) and pass on the cost savings in the form of lower prices.

=== Concept store ===
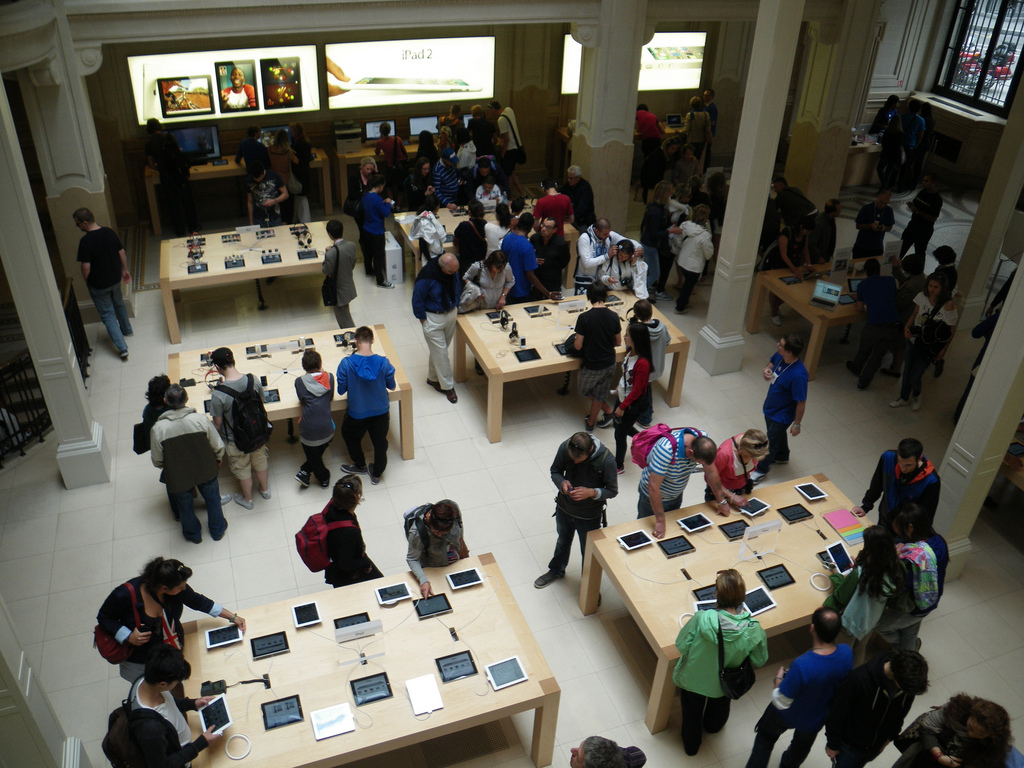
Apple's concept stores include video walls, wi-fi and desks to provide an immersive customer experience.

Concept stores are similar to speciality stores in that they are very small in size, and only stock a limited range of brands or a single brand. They are typically operated by the brand that controls them, such as L'Occitane en Provence. Concept stores use experiential marketing approaches, such as unique architecture, lighting, music, and furniture to attract consumers.

The limited size and offering of L'Occitane stores is too small to be considered a speciality store. However, a concept store goes beyond merely selling products, and instead offers an immersive customer experience built around the way that a brand fits with the customer's lifestyle. Examples include the Apple Stores and Kit Kat's concept store in Japan.

=== Co-operative store ===
A co-operative store; also known as a co-op or coop, is a venture owned and operated by consumers to meet their social, economic, and cultural needs.

=== Convenience store ===
A convenience store provides a limited amount of merchandise at above average prices with a speedy checkout. This is ideal for emergency and immediate purchase consumables as it often operates with extended hours, stocking every day.

=== Department store ===
Department stores are very large stores offering an extensive assortment of both "soft" and "hard" goods that often bear a resemblance to a collection of specialty stores. A retailer of such a store carries a variety of categories and has a broad assortment of goods at moderate prices. They offer considerable customer service.

=== Destination store ===
A destination store is one that customers will initiate a trip specifically to visit, sometimes over a large area. These stores are often used to "anchor" a shopping center (mall), generating foot traffic, which is capitalized upon by smaller retailers.

=== Demographic ===
Retailers that aim at one particular segment (e.g., high-end/ luxury retailers focusing on wealthy individuals or niche markets).

=== Discount store ===
Discount stores tend to offer a wide array of products and services, but they compete mainly on price. They offer extensive assortments of merchandise at prices lower than those of other retailers and are designed to be affordable for the market served. In the past, retailers sold fewer fashion-oriented brands. However, in more recent years, companies such as TJX Companies (owns TJ Maxx and Marshalls) and Ross Stores are discount store operations increasingly offering fashion-oriented brands on a larger scale.

=== E-tailer ===
The customer can shop and order through the internet, and the merchandise is dropped at the customer's doorstep or an e-tailer. In some cases, e-retailers use the drop shipping technique. They accept the payment for the product, but the customer receives the product directly from the manufacturer or a wholesaler. This format is ideal for customers who do not want to travel to retail stores and are interested in home shopping.

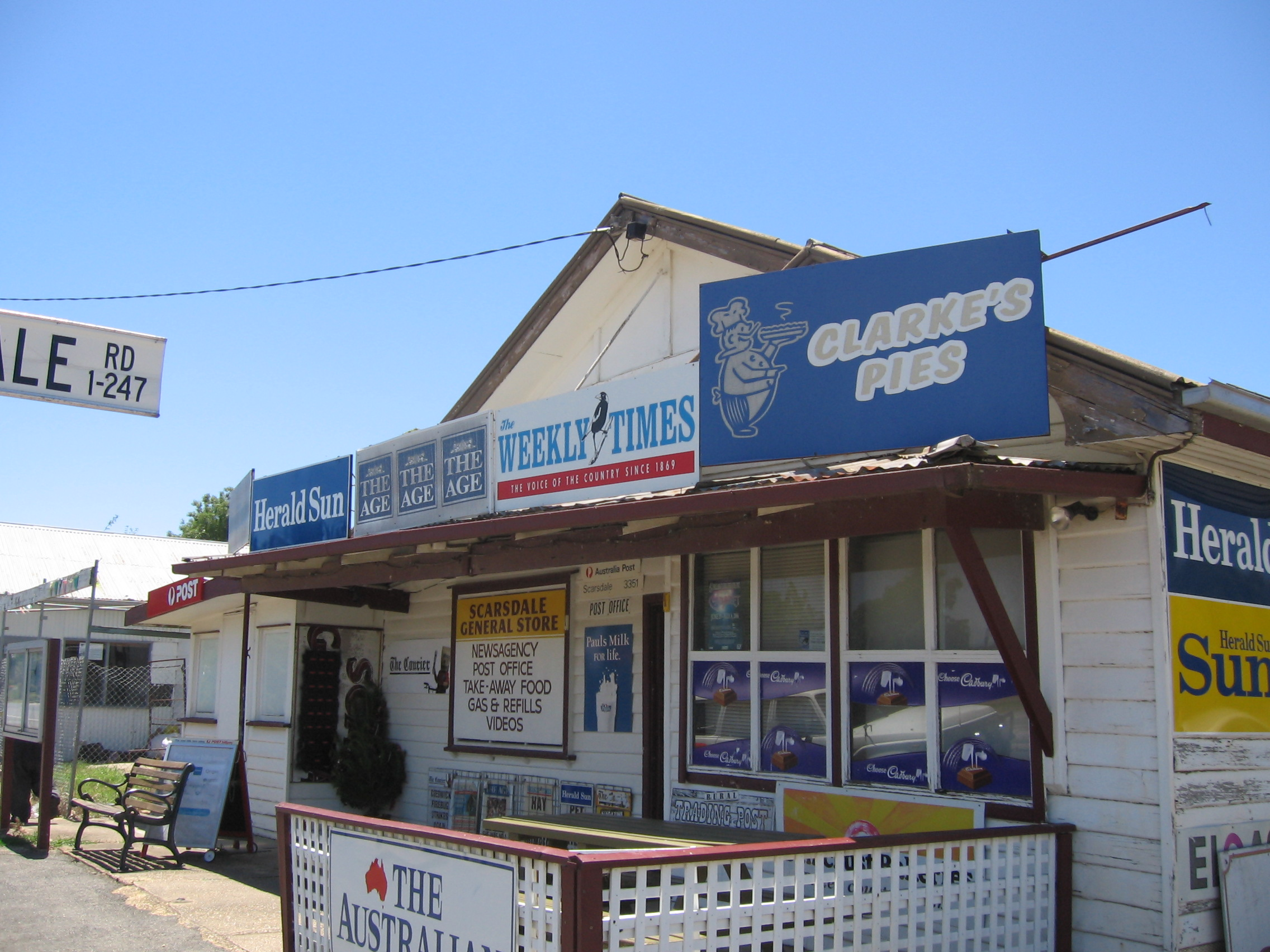
A general store in Scarsdale, Victoria, Australia operates as a post-office, newsagent, petrol station, video hire, grocer and take-away food retailer.

=== General merchandise retailer ===
A general merchandise retailer stocks a variety of products in considerable depth. The types of product offerings vary across this category. Department stores, convenience stores, hypermarkets, and warehouse clubs are all examples of general merchandise retailers.

=== General store ===
A general store supplies the main needs of the local community and is often located in outback or rural areas with low population densities. In areas of very low population density, a general store may be the only retail outlet within hundreds of miles. The general store carries a very broad product assortment, from foodstuffs and pharmaceuticals through to hardware and fuel. In addition, a general store may provide essential services such as postal services, banking services, news agency services, and may also act as an agent for farm equipment and stock-food suppliers.

=== Give-away shop ===
A give-away shop provides goods for free. There are several different models of a give-away shop in popular use. One is where goods are free to any shopper; an alternative is that shoppers must provide a product before they can take a product, and a third variation is where consumers have the option of taking goods for free or paying any amount that they can afford. For example, Australia's restaurant group Lentil as Anything operates on a pay whatever you feel is right model.

=== Hawkers ===
Hawkers, also known as peddlers, costermongers or street vendors, are vendors of merchandise that is readily portable. Hawkers typically operate in public places such as streets, squares, public parks or gardens, or near the entrances of high traffic venues such as zoos, music and entertainment venues, but may also call on homes for door-to-door selling. Hawkers are a relatively common sight across Asia.

=== High Street store ===
High Street store is a term used widely in the United Kingdom, where more than 5,000 High Streets have a variety of stores congregating along a main road. Stores situated in the High Street provide for the needs of a local community, and often give a locality a unique identity.

=== Hypermarkets ===
A hypermarket (also known as hypermart) provides variety and huge volumes of exclusive merchandise at low margins. The operating cost is comparatively less than other retail formats; it may be defined as "a combined supermarket and discount store, at least 200,000 square feet (19,000 m^{2}) or larger, that sells a wide variety of food and general merchandise at a low price."

=== Market square ===
A market square is a city square where traders set up temporary stalls, and buyers browse for purchases. In England, such markets operate on specific days of the week. This kind of market is very ancient, and countless such markets are still in operation around the world.

=== Mom-and-pop store ===
A small retail outlet owned and operated by an individual or family. Focuses on a relatively limited and selective set of products.

=== Pop-up retail store ===
A Pop-up retail store is a temporary retail space that opens for a short period of time, possibly opening to sell a specific run of merchandise or for a special occasion or holiday period. The key to the success of a pop-up is novelty in the merchandise.

=== Retail marketplace ===
A Marketplace is defined as a venue for the retail sales of all products, packed and unpacked, where the sale is to end users. In practice, retail markets are most often associated with the sale of fresh produce, including fruit, vegetables, meat, fish, and poultry, but may also sell small consumable household goods such as cleaning agents. In the Middle East, a marketplace may be known as a bazaar or souq.

=== Second-hand shop ===
Some shops sell second-hand goods. In the case of a nonprofit shop, the public donates goods to the shop to be sold. In the give-away shop, goods can be taken for free.

Another form is the pawnshop, in which goods are sold that were used as collateral for loans. There are also "consignment" shops, which are where a person can place an item in a store, and if it sells, the person gives the shop owner a percentage of the sale price. The advantage of selling an item this way is that the established shop gives the item exposure to more potential buyers. E-tailers like OLX and Quikr also offer second-hand goods.

Retailers can opt for a format as each provides a different retail mix to its customers based on their customer demographics, lifestyle, and purchase behaviour. An effective format will determine how products are displayed, as well as how target customers are attracted.

=== Shopping center, shopping mall ===
A shopping center is a collection of shops, often under one roof. Types of shopping centers include super-regional and regional centers (in North America and some other areas, called shopping malls), smaller neighborhood centers (in the U.K. a retail park) and strip malls, and larger specialized centers such as power centers (in the U.K. also considered a type of retail park), lifestyle centers, outlet centers and festival marketplaces. The retail mix in a mall may include outlets such as food and entertainment, grocery, electronics, furniture, gifts, and fashion. Malls provide 7% of retail revenue in India, 10% in Vietnam, 25% in China, 28% in Indonesia, 39% in the Philippines, and 45% in Thailand. Shopping centers are typically managed by a central management/ marketing authority which ensures that the center attracts the right type of retailer and an appropriate retail mix.

=== Speciality store ===
A speciality/specialty store has a narrow marketing focus – either specializing on specific merchandise, such as toys, footwear, or clothing, or on a target audience, such as children, tourists, or plus-size women. Size of store varies – some speciality stores might be retail giants such as Toys "R" Us, Foot Locker, and The Body Shop, while others might be small, individual shops such as Nutters of Savile Row.

Such stores, regardless of size, tend to have a greater depth of specialist stock than general stores, and generally offer specialist product knowledge valued by the consumer. Pricing is usually not the priority when consumers are deciding upon a speciality store; factors such as branding image, selection choice, and purchasing assistance are seen as important. They differ from department stores and supermarkets, which carry a wide range of merchandise.

=== Supermarket ===
A supermarket is a self-service store consisting mainly of grocery and limited products, with non-food items. They may adopt a high-low pricing strategy, an everyday low pricing approach, or a combination of both. The supermarkets can be anywhere between 20,000 square feet (1,900 m^{2}) and 40,000 square feet (3,700 m^{2}). An example is a SPAR supermarket.

=== Variety store ===
Variety stores offers extremely low-cost goods, with a vast array of selection. The downfall to this is that the items are not very high quality.

=== Vending machine ===
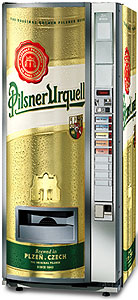
Vending machines can be used to sell goods such as food, beverages, and services such as tickets to events or public transport. A beer vending machine is pictured.

A vending machine is an automated piece of equipment wherein customers can drop money in the machine, which dispenses the customer's selection. The vending machine is a pure self-service option. Machines may carry a phone number that customers can call in the event of a fault.

Some stores take a no frills approach, while others are "mid-range" or "high end", depending on what income level they target.

=== Warehouse club ===
Warehouse clubs are membership-based retailers that usually sell a wide variety of merchandise, in which customers may buy large, wholesale quantities of the store's products, which makes these clubs attractive to both bargain hunters and small business owners. The clubs are able to keep prices low due to the no-frills format of the stores. In addition, customers may be required to pay annual membership fees to shop.

=== Warehouse store ===
Warehouse stores are retailers housed in warehouses, and offer low-cost, often high-quantity goods with minimal services, e.g., goods are piled on pallets or steel shelves. Shopping aisles are narrow and cramped, and added-value services such as home delivery are nonexistent.
