= Everyone's Talking (band) =

- Origin: Toronto, Ontario, Canada
- Genres: Piano rock
- Years active: 2008–present
- Members: Evan Kuhn; Dani Rosenoer
- Website: everyonestalking.net

Everyone's Talking is a Canadian piano rock band formed in 2008 in Toronto. The group consists of Evan Kuhn (vocals, guitar) and Dani Rosenoer (vocals, piano). Both members share the songwriting responsibilities. The band has released two EP's Chapter 1 (2008) and Chapter 2 (2009) and a full-length album Dragonflies (2009) produced by the Grammy Award winner David Bottrill.

== History ==
In November 2009, the band made their Dragonflies release available for download on a pay what you want basis on their official website.

After the 2010 Haiti earthquake, in order to help the survivors the band announced that they would donate all profits made from album downloads in the last week of January 2010 to Médecins Sans Frontières. That year the band was nominated for Best Alternative Rock recording at the Toronto Independent Music Awards.

The group played their first show outside of Canada in Monterrey, Mexico on August 13, 2010.

== Discography ==
=== Albums ===
- Dragonflies (2009)

=== EPs ===
- Chapter 1: Desedero (2008)
- Chapter 2: Adventure (2009)
- Chapter 3: Remix (2010)

=== Singles ===
- "Dragonflies" (2009)
- "War Pt.1" (2010)
