= Radstorm =

Event space in Halifax, Nova Scotia, Canada

Radstrom
- Location: 2177 Gottingen Street, Halifax, Nova Scotia, Canada
- Website: www.radstorm.org

Radstorm is a not-for-profit events and art space, collectively run on a volunteer basis since 2004. Located at 2177 Gottingen Street in the North End, Halifax, Nova Scotia, Radstorm houses three collectives; SADRAD all ages music venue, Inkstorm screen printing studio, and the Anchor Archive Zine Library.

== Objectives ==
Managed as a pay-what-you-can space, the group also houses resources for collective members and community members including; The People’s Photocopier, The People’s Fridge, and The People’s Kiln & Clay Space Radstorm operates within open-hours as a volunteer-run space. This means that facilities and resources in the space are offered to the collective and community members at specific times during the week which the collectives advertise through social media as well as on their community bulletin board on the front of their space on Gottingen Street.

The space also operates as a dry (but not sober) venue, as an all ages and shared space. This means that any and all events, workshops or gatherings held within Radstorm and the subsets of Radstorm (SADRAD, Inkstorm and Anchor Archive Zine Library) do not allow drugs or alcohol in an effort to remain accessible to all collective and community members; however, people will not be turned away for being under the influence when they arrive.

== Collectives ==
=== SADRAD All Ages Music Venue ===
The SADRAD all ages music venue has been in existence since late 2012. The collective was created in order to include underage musicians in the arts community in Halifax and is in part why it upholds its dry venue policy. SADRAD provides a venue space that includes a Public Address system, music equipment (amplifiers, cables, microphones, microphone stands, guitars, and a drum kit), Recording equipment, a soundproofed playing and recording space, and an RV/Marine battery for powering outdoor shows.

=== Inkstorm Screenprinting Studio ===
Inkstorm Screenprinting Studio has been a part of Radstorm since its opening in 2004, and is a screen printing studio and resource centre. Inkstorm advertises as “affordable studio space” however volunteers at Inkstorm offer introductory classes during open hours, or during scheduled Inkstorm events. Available resources include; a light table, dark box, washout stand and backlight, powerwasher, printing tables and hinge clamps, rentable screens, ink, squeegees, scoop coaters, monthly intro workshops and affordable 24/7 access memberships.

=== Anchor Archive Zine Library ===
The Anchor Archive Zine Library has been active since 2005, and houses over 7000 Zines in their library collection. Anchor Archive Zine Library allows access to zines made within Radstorm as well as collected zines made outside the facilities to members of the library program. Alongside the archive and library collections, they offer resources for those making their own zines. These resources include: The People’s Photocopier with black and white as well as colour printing, typewriters, a label maker, a long arm stapler, paper cutters, a button maker, and other miscellaneous zine making supplies. The zine archive houses an online collection as well as its physical location based within Radstorm. The online location is accessible through an external link found on Radstorm’s website or is searchable at its distinct web address. Their website offers a comprehensive search engine by author, subject, or title. The website also advertises new additions to their archive and library.

== Residency Programs ==
The Anchor Archive Zine Library hosts a zine fair every year in the early fall in which zine authors and other printed media artists from Nova Scotia, as well as outside Nova Scotia, have the ability to showcase their work. This event is called ZineFest, and is a continuation of the formerly named “Halifax Zine Fair”. Through ZineFest, Anchor Archive has begun a residency program, Zinefest Residency, tailored to zine making, in which two artists starting in September 2020 would begin the residency in Halifax with provided accommodation and studio spaces. Their final projects were to be showcased at ZineFest by October 3, 2020. Through Radstorm, Inkstorm Screenprinting Studio, SADRAD and Anchor Archive Zine Library a residency program open to artists in visual, performing, and other creative arts was started in 2016. The program ran in partnership with the Deanery Project, a not-for-profit collective in the Eastern Shore (Nova Scotia). The residency offered artists the space and resources to complete their proposed projects or events, as well as accommodation near to Radstorm.

== Fundraising ==
As of 2020 Radstorm is hoping to permanently secure their Gottingen street location by purchasing the building. The collective’s volunteer based staff handle fundraising and grant applications needed to purchase the space. The collective uses crowdfunding websites in order to crowdfund donations to put towards the purchasing of the space.
