= SAME Cafe =

Community cafe in Denver, Colorado, USA

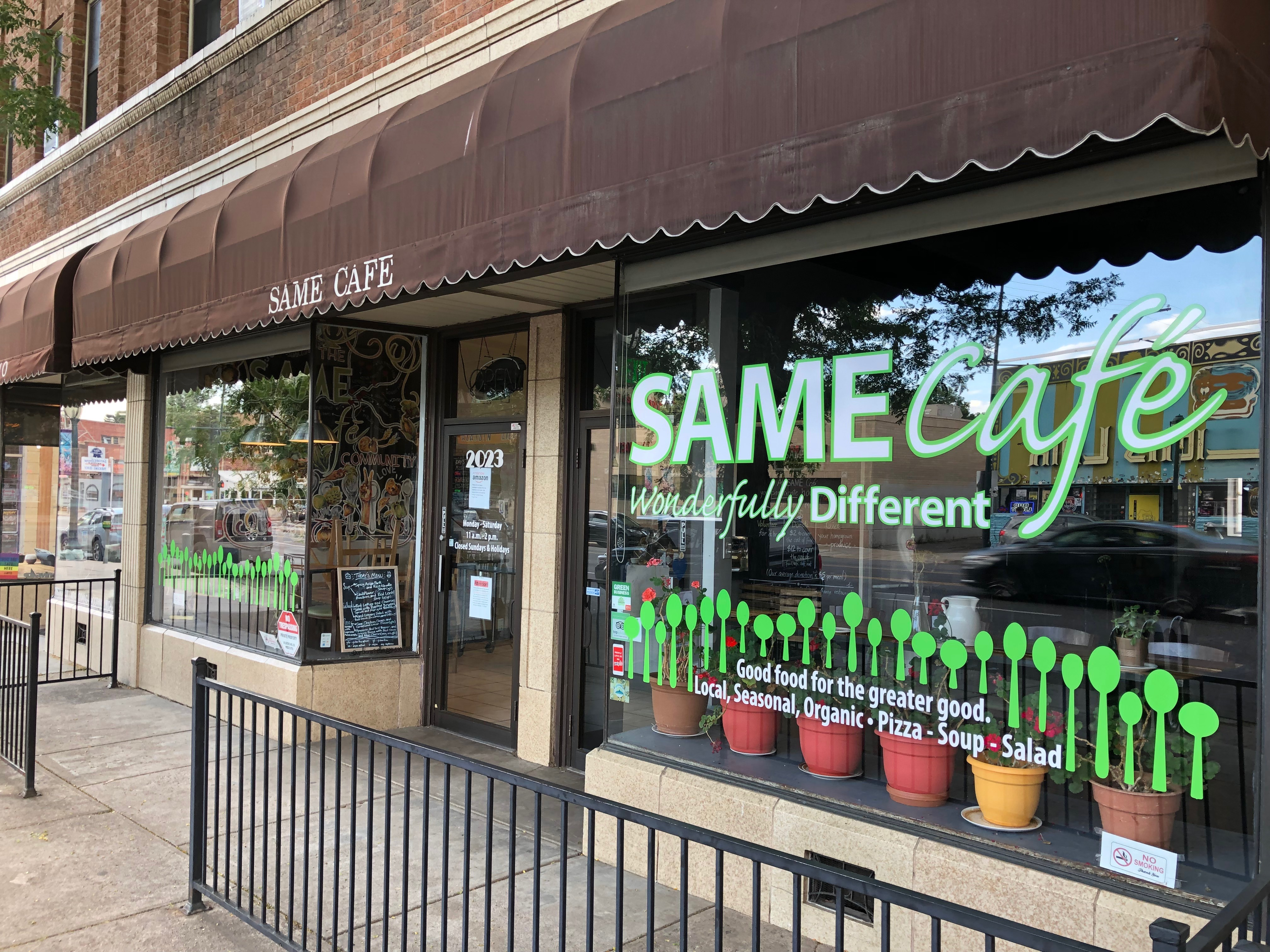
- SAME Cafe storefront
- Formation: October 20, 2006
- Type: Nonprofit organization
- Location: Denver, Colorado, United States
- Coordinates: 39.739914°N 104.96288°W
- Website: soallmayeat.org

The SAME Cafe is a nonprofit community cafe with locations in Denver, Colorado, United States. Brad and Libby Birky invested $30,000 to open the original restaurant at 2023 East Colfax Avenue, Denver, on October 20, 2006, inspired by their background in community service and a visit to the One World Cafe in Salt Lake City, Utah. They opened the second SAME Cafe site in November 2022, in the Main Library of Toledo, OH and closed the location in 2025. The name is an acronym for "So All May Eat", and their motto is "healthy food access for all". They offer higher quality food in a pay what you can format where the diner puts what they feel their meal was worth in a donation box. They also accept a 1/2 hour of volunteer help in exchange for a meal, made possible by Colorado laws which do not require a food handlers certificate for restaurant workers.

== Economics ==
They pay about $2,500 a month for rent and approximately $2,500 for the food. Before their expansion in November, 2008 they served 40–50 meals a day with seven tables. Since the expansion they now serve 75–100 meals a day. The average food cost is approximately $2 and the average donation per meal determined by a reporter was $3.66. Over time, the average donation has decreased, but it was offset by an increase in customers. They offer a limited menu which changes daily, simplifying the variety of food they need to purchase and reducing the amount of wasted food. They buy from a variety of sources, including direct from local farmers, warehouse stores such as Costco, higher end grocery stores such as Whole Foods Market and even the Denver Botanic Gardens.

They were originally open for lunch six days a week and closed on Sunday. Currently, they are only open Monday through Friday.

== Recognition ==
On the March 9, 2009 NBC Nightly News broadcast, Brian Williams singled out the SAME Cafe for recognition in the "Make a Difference" segment. That broadcast inspired Panera Bread CEO Ron Shaich to create in 2010 a chain of six similar restaurants, Panera Cares, all of which closed by 2019.
