= Shanaka Fernando =

Australian restaurateur (born 1968)

Shanaka Fernando (born 1968) is a Sri Lankan-born Australian restaurateur and self-described "social challenger", best known for his founding of the pay what you can chain of restaurants in Melbourne known as "Lentil as Anything".

== Early life ==
Fernando was born in Thimbirigasyaya, a suburb (divisional secretariat) of Colombo, Sri Lanka, to an Irish Catholic mother and a father of Portuguese descent. He attended a Buddhist school and was involved in theatre and choreography. He appeared in productions of Fame and Guys and Dolls.

== Australia ==
Fernando arrived in Australia in 1989 and lived on the St Kilda foreshore. He travelled in the Third World, and developed an interest in social justice issues. Before opening a pay what you can non-profit vegetarian restaurant in St Kilda in 2000 (Lentil as Anything), he served as a rollercoaster driver at Luna Park. The non-profit restaurant has since expanded locations, with numerous venues operating under the "Lentil as Anything" banner, including one at the former Abbotsford Convent.

== Recognition ==
In 2007, Fernando won the Australian of the Year "Local Hero Award", receiving the award from the then Prime Minister John Howard.

He has been honoured with an Australian postage stamp, and is listed in Who's Who in Australia, 2008 Edition. In 2009, SBS TV produced a series of four television documentaries on Fernando's enterprise, philosophy and struggles (which include a four-year battle with the Australian Taxation Office over a tax bill of $300,000, which was resolved in Fernando's favour by the law on GST being changed to reduce its application to organisations that are non-profit motivated and have no fixed prices).

He has written a book titled Lentil as Anything: Everybody Deserves a Place at the Table, with Greg Hill, and is often asked to address groups, including sharing the podium with Joan Kirner, a former Premier of Victoria.

He has appeared in the National Assessment Program - Literacy and Numeracy (Naplan) exam citing the values he promotes. The Lentil as Anything values were created into a teaching unit by the department of education and distributed throughout Australian primary schools

He was invited by the Dalai Lama to join him as a guest judge on MasterChef Australia, season 3, episode 67.

He was inducted to the Museum of Australian Democracy and features in the Living Democracy gallery which includes some examples of the many ways food is intrinsically linked to human rights.

Yet, he says he dislikes attention, and has done what he has done in order to influence others to adopt a more appropriate philosophy.

Controversy

In 2021, Fernando was accused of serious misconduct and mismanagement after he allegedly used the charity for personal financial gain, misused government grants and hired a friend as a “ghost” employee. A confidential report into the charity by forensic accountants RSM alleged that $11,279 of the registered charity’s money might have been improperly used on a range of Mr Fernando’s private expenses including paying his electricity, water and gas bills, and travel.

Whistleblowers referred to in the report have raised concerns that Mr Fernando supplemented his $80,000 a year salary package, paying rent and child support from the charity’s money. Fernando insisted his pay was consistent with his agreed salary package which included benefits such as utilities and rent.

The report details further whistleblower allegations that personal expenses for trips by Mr Fernando to Finland and Sri Lanka were at least part paid for by Lentil as Anything. A whistleblower also claimed that fraudulent contracts were entered into with hire purchase companies, on top of previously reported unpaid superannuation and underpayment of staff wages.

Fernando denied the allegations.

== Personal ==
Fernando has five children now, four from his current partner, and one from a previous relationship. A dispute over unpaid child support benefits resulted in the freezing of his bank account, and has since been resolved. He told the journalist: "The love of a parent should never be confused with or measured by money. A parent shows love by spending time with their children in a celebration of love and life”.

In 2011 he faced Melbourne Magistrates' Court over 52 unpaid traffic fines amounting to over $14,000. He claimed that many of them arose through his lending his car to friends and refugees he was helping. At the trial, he explained "My father instructed me that I had a fine tradition to keep up", but the judge was not impressed by this attempt at humour. Later, he went to the infringements office to enter into a payment plan, and they had been waived.
