= Tour guide =

Person who provides cultural heritage interpretation to tourists

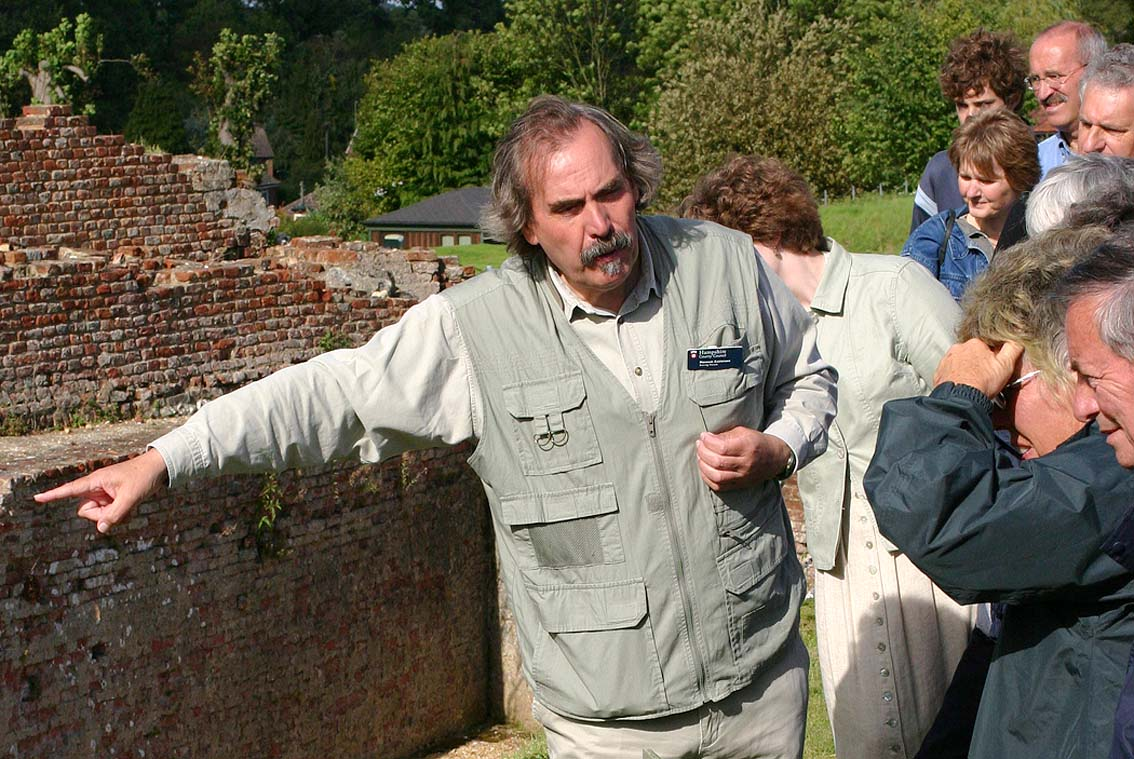
A tourist guide in the United Kingdom

A tourist guide is a person who guides visitors in the language of their choice and interprets the cultural and natural heritage of an area. Tourist guides normally possess an area-specific qualification, usually issued and/or recognised by the appropriate authority. The term "tourist guide" is the internationally recognised professional designation, established by major international standards and supported by professional organisations worldwide. In the United States, the colloquial term "tour guide" is commonly used, though this does not align with international professional standards. Tourist guides provide assistance and information on cultural, historical and contemporary heritage to people on organized sightseeing and individual clients at educational establishments, religious and historical sites such as museums, and at various venues of tourist attraction resorts. Tourist guides also take clients on outdoor guided trips, including hiking, whitewater rafting, mountaineering, alpine climbing, rock climbing, ski and snowboarding in the backcountry, fishing, and biking.

== History ==
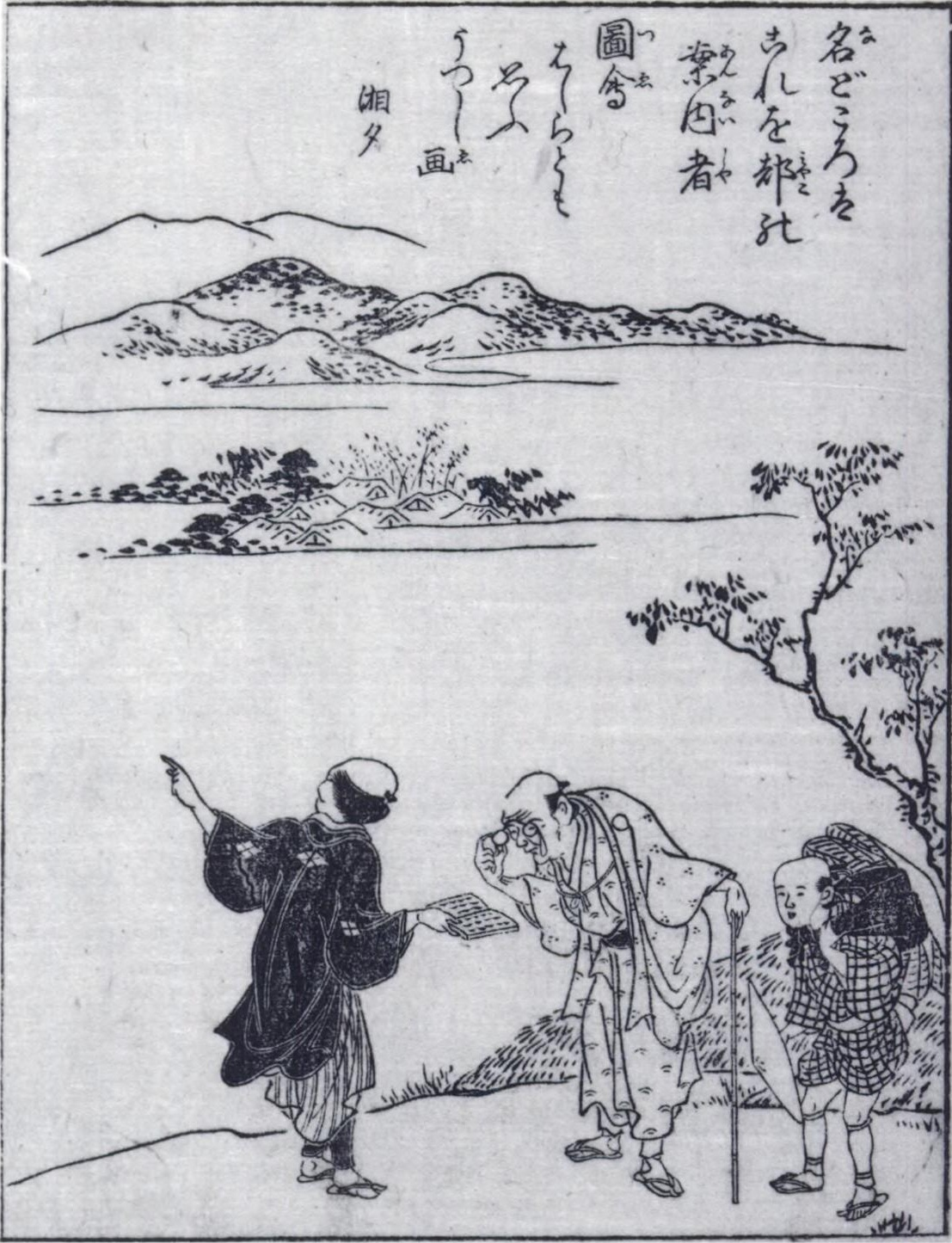
A Japanese tourist consulting a tourist guide and a guide book from Akizato Ritō's Miyako meisho zue (1787)

The profession of tourist guiding has ancient origins, with historical records indicating that guides accompanied travellers in classical antiquity. In 18th-century Japan, a traveler could pay for a tourist guide or consult guide books such as Kaibara Ekken's Keijō Shōran (The Excellent Views of Kyoto). The modern profession emerged during the 19th century alongside the development of organised tourism. The establishment of Thomas Cook's travel company in 1841 marked the beginning of professionalised tourist services, including organised guiding. Professional standards for tourist guides began developing in the 20th century as tourism became a significant economic sector. The World Federation of Tourist Guide Associations (WFTGA) was founded in 1985 to represent the profession globally and establish unified standards. The organisation has since grown to represent over 200,000 tourist guides through 87 member associations in more than 100 countries.

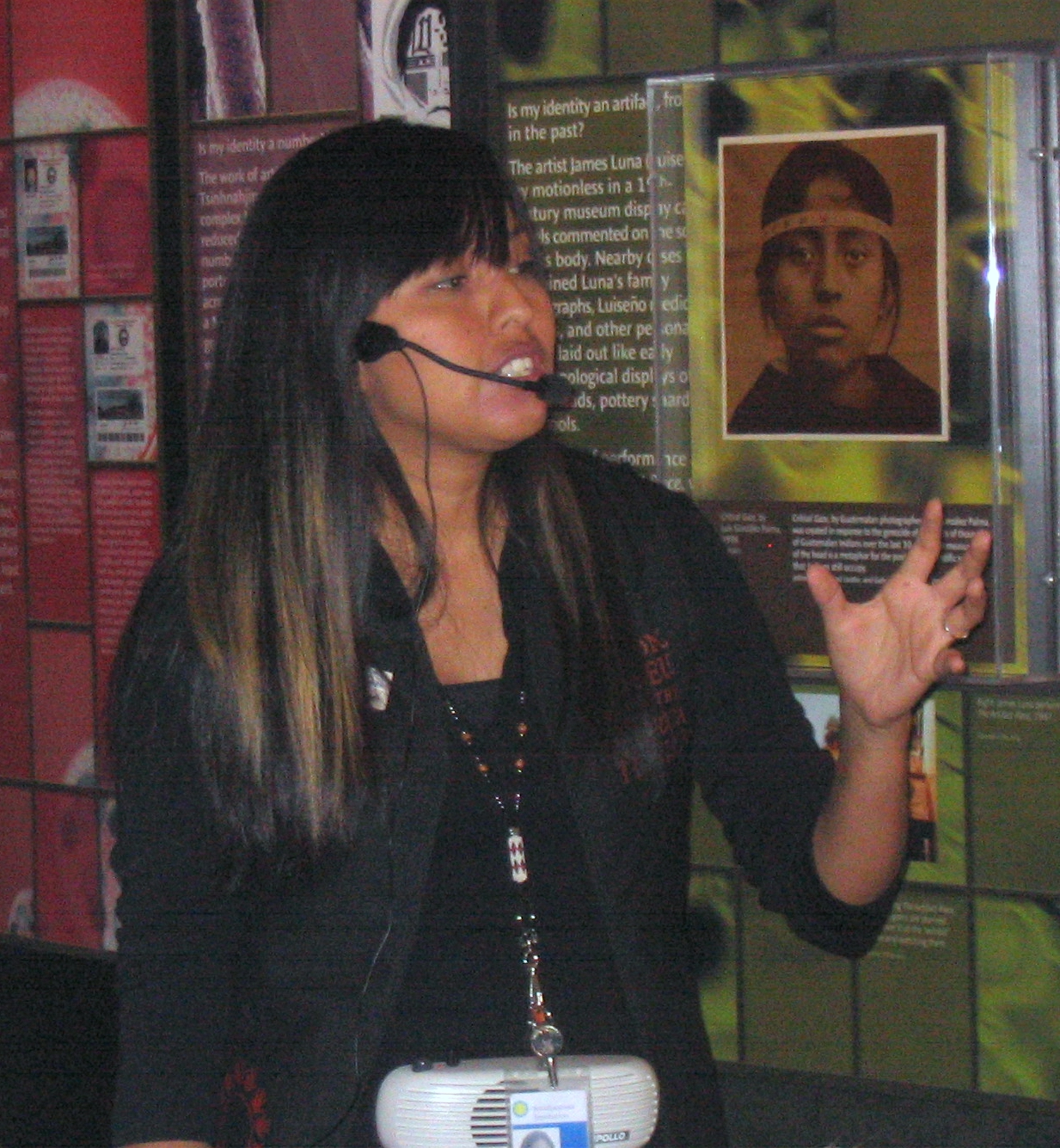
A tourist guide in the National Museum of the American Indian

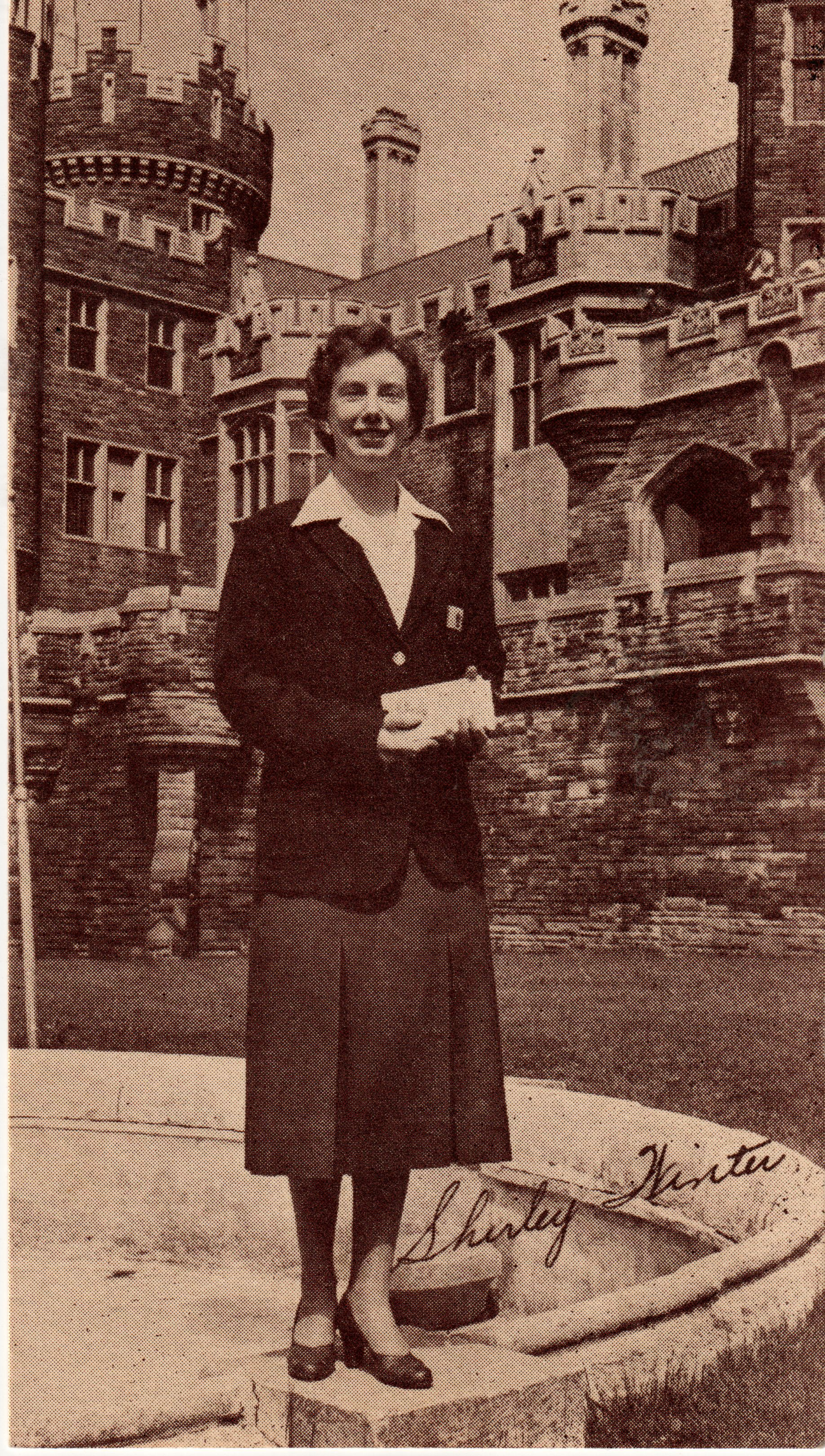
Tour guide stands in front of Casa Loma in Ontario, Canada. Approximately mid twentieth century

== International standards and professional organisations ==
=== World Federation of Tourist Guide Associations ===
The World Federation of Tourist Guide Associations (WFTGA) is the global representative body for the tourist guide profession. Founded in 1985, the organisation represents over 200,000 tourist guides through member associations worldwide. WFTGA has consultative status with UNESCO as a Non-Governmental Organisation and is an affiliate member of UN Tourism (formerly UNWTO).

=== International Standards ===
Three key international standards govern the tourist guide profession: EN 13809:2003: This European standard defines tourist guiding services and establishes the fundamental distinction between tourist guides and other tourism professionals. The CEN (European Committee for Standardization) definition for "tourist guide" is a "person who guides visitors in the language of their choice and interprets the cultural and natural heritage of an area, which person normally possesses an area-specific qualification usually issued and/or recognized by the appropriate authority". ISO 18513:2003: The International Organization for Standardization's tourism vocabulary standard includes definitions for tourist guiding services, providing global consistency in terminology. EN 15565:2008: This standard specifies requirements for professional tourist guide training and qualification programmes. It ensures that training programmes meet consistent quality standards and cover essential competencies required for professional practice.

== Regional implementation ==
=== Australia ===
In Australia, tourist guides may be qualified with a Certificate III Guiding although this is not compulsory. They may belong to organisations such as Tour Guides Australia [TGA] and the Institute of Australian Tour Guides [IATG]. According to the Tour Guides Australia Code of Conduct, guides must commit to providing professional service, objective interpretations, environmental education, promoting the country as a destination, ongoing professional development, maintaining first aid certification, and carrying appropriate insurance.

=== Europe ===
In Europe, tourist guides are represented by FEG, the European Federation of Tourist Guide Associations, which represents over 60,000 tourist guides. In Europe, the tourist guiding qualification is specific to each country; in some cases the qualification is national, in some cases it is broken up into regions. In all cases, it is embedded in the educational and training ethic of that country. EN15565 is a European Standard for the Training and Qualification of Tourist Guides.

In recent years, the growth of digital platforms offering so-called "free tours" has generated debate in several European countries. Professional associations of licensed tour guides have argued that platforms such as GuruWalk may enable guides to operate outside traditional accreditation systems, while supporters of these platforms contend that they expand access to guided tours and increase competition within the sector.

=== Turkey ===
The regulation of tourist guiding in Turkey dates back to the Ottoman Empire, when the "Regulation Concerning Persons Interpreting for Travellers" (Seyyahlara Tercümanlık Edenlere Dair Nizamname) was enacted on November 10, 1890, making it one of the earliest formal legal frameworks for the profession worldwide. This regulation required interpreters and guides to obtain certificates, and those found engaging in guiding activities without proper certification faced revocation of their documents and criminal penalties under the penal code. Following the establishment of the Republic of Turkey in 1923, new regulations were introduced in 1925, marking the profession's first golden age between 1925 and 1930. The modern legal framework is governed by the Tourist Guiding Profession Law No. 6326, enacted in 2012, which places the profession under the supervision of the Ministry of Culture and Tourism.

To obtain a license, candidates must either graduate from a university-level tourist guidance programme — where the curriculum includes Turkish and Ottoman history, history of religions, Byzantine and Ottoman art history, archaeology, mythology and at least one foreign language studied over eight semesters — or hold a degree in archaeology, art history or Far Eastern languages and complete an additional training programme. All candidates are required to pass a foreign language proficiency examination with a minimum score of 75 out of 100 and complete a mandatory educational tour of at least 45 days across one or more of the designated guiding zones into which Turkey is divided. Each guide's license specifies the geographic zones and languages in which they are authorized to operate. The profession is overseen by the Turkish Tourist Guides Union (Turist Rehberleri Birliği, TUREB), which determines official base fees, organizes training programmes, and provides legal support to its members. TUREB is composed of 13 regional chambers, the largest being the Istanbul Chamber of Tourist Guides (İRO), which has over 4,900 members. As of the early 2020s, there were approximately 11,700 licensed tourist guides in Turkey, of whom around 7,500 are certified in the English language.

Operating as a tourist guide without a valid license is strictly prohibited; individuals found guiding without authorization face significant fines and potential imprisonment, while travel agencies that organize tours using unlicensed guides risk severe financial penalties and the cancellation of their agency license. Turkey's tourist guiding system is distinctive internationally for its rigorous university-level educational requirements, its zone-based licensing structure, and the legal protection afforded to the profession — a level of regulation that is uncommon in many other countries where guiding remains largely unregulated.

=== India ===
In India it is mandatory to have a license approved by the Ministry of Tourism (India) to work officially as a tourist guide. The government provides the license to regional-level tourist guides and also runs a Regional Level Guide Training Program (RLGTP). These programs and training sessions are conducted under the guidance of Indian Institute of Tourism and Travel Management (IITTM) or other government-recognized institutes.

=== Iran ===
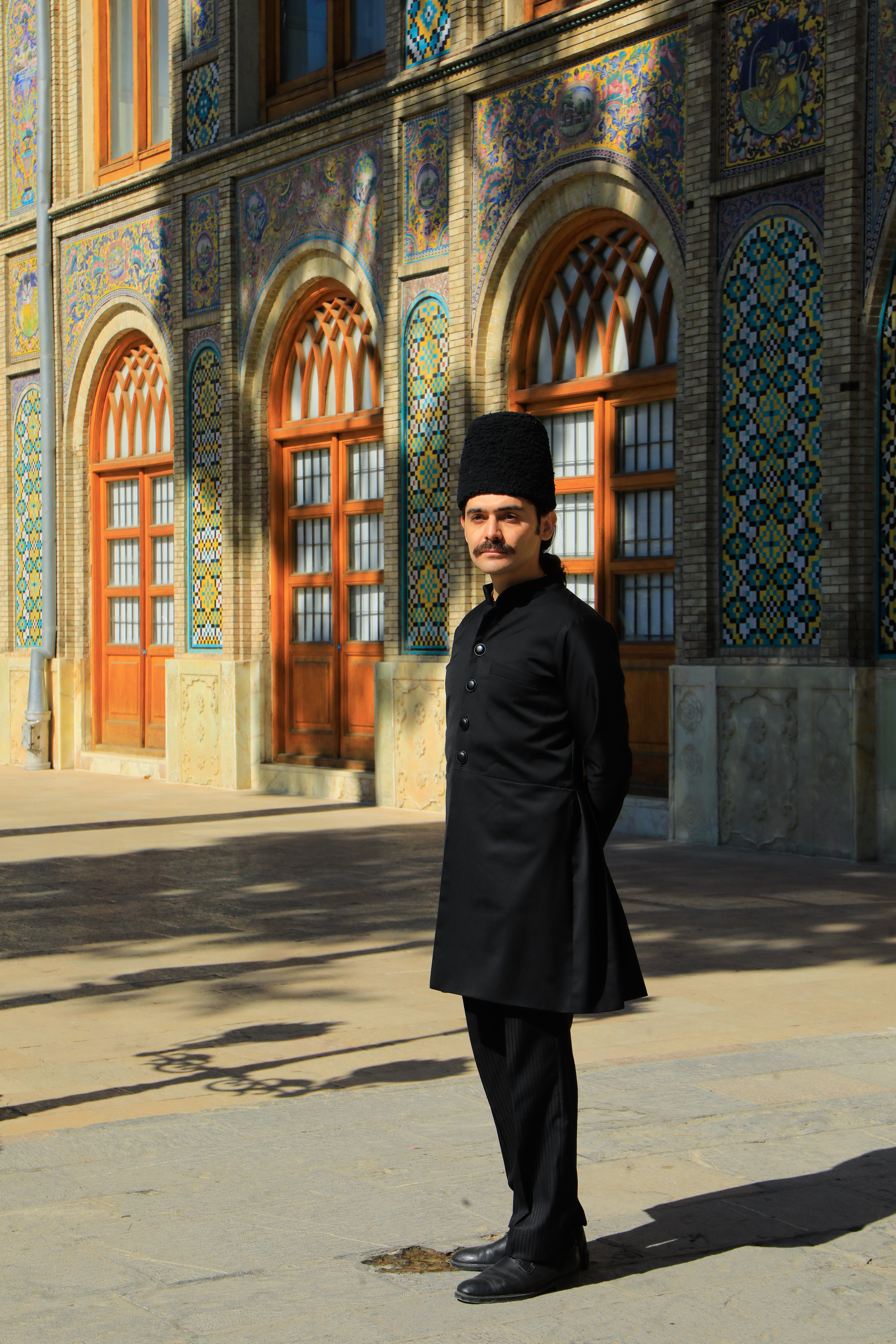
a tour guide in Golestan Palace, wearing 19th-century Qajar Persia costume

In Iran, those who want to become a certified tourist guide must take part in a dedicated course, pass a nationwide written exam and also a provincial oral test. The certificate is issued by Ministry of Cultural Heritage, Tourism and Handicrafts and is valid for one year. After the validity period, the guides can renew their certificates without participating in another course. Only those who have at least a bachelor's degree can be certified. Since 2024, those guides who are actively working and are members of the official tourist guide associations of their provinces, can ask for social security.

=== Japan ===
In Japan, tourist guides are required to pass a certification exam by the Commissioner of the Japan Tourism Agency and register with the relevant prefectures. Non-licensed guides caught performing guide-interpreter activities can face a fine of up to 500,000 yen.

=== South Africa ===
In South Africa tourist guides are required to register in terms of the Tourism Act 3, 2014. Training must be done through a trainer accredited by the Culture, Arts, Tourism, Hospitality and Sport Sector Education and Training Authority.

== See also ==
- Audio tour
- Blue Badge tourist guide
- Cell phone tour
- Cicerone
- Free Walking Tour
- GPS tour
- Institute of Tourist Guiding
- Museum docent
- Museum education
- Seasonworker
- Tourism
- Tour operator
- Cultural tourism
- Heritage interpretation
- Sustainable tourism
