= Terra Bite Lounge =

Coffeehouse in Kirkland, Washington

Terra Bite café poster, July 2007

Terra Bite Lounge was a coffeehouse that opened in Kirkland, Washington in late 2006. When the shop first opened, it was unique in that customers choose what to pay. After a year, the shop switched over to a normal fixed-prices menu. The owner, Ervin Peretz, stated that the "choose what to pay" model was not sustainable in a neighborhood that is popular with teenagers.

In the voluntary payment system, patrons deposit their cash in a locked box and store employees do not handle cash per transaction. In fact, employees aren't necessarily aware of how much the patron contributed. However, Terra Bite asked customers who could pay to contribute what they would elsewhere. The voluntary payment system is a convenience for most customers, who may, for example, choose to pay once a week for their daily coffee.

In interviews, Peretz has stated that he intends to expand the Terra Bite concept to new stores, in places with demographics that can sustain a new Terra Bite. His goal is to create a highly efficient operation that can sustainably spread from upper demographics throughout the rest of society, where a non-stigmatizing source of food is needed.

The coffeehouse has since closed.

== See also ==
- Pay what you want
