= Shoppy shop =

Type of boutique food store

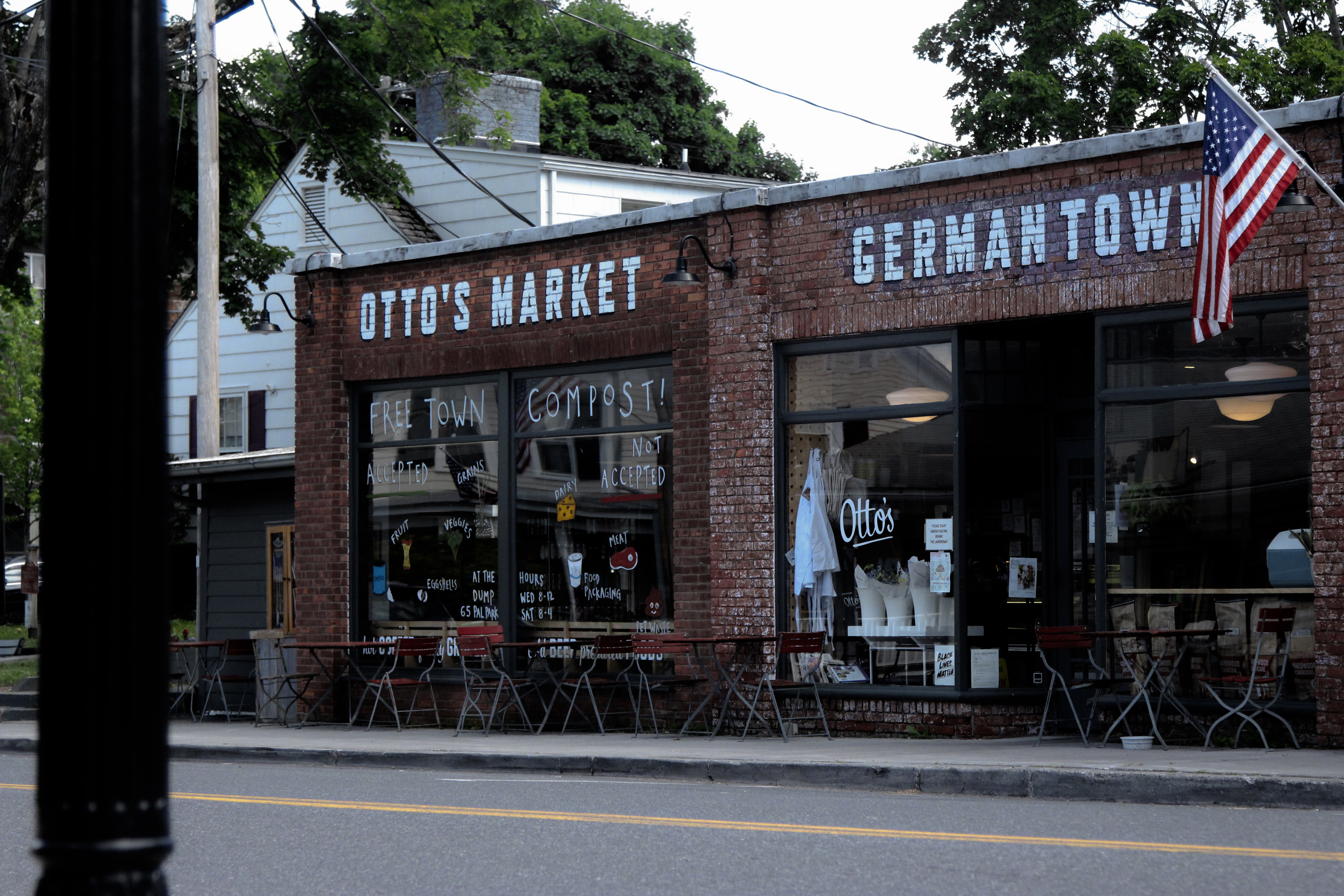
Otto's Market in Germantown, New York

A shoppy shop (also known as a microgrocery) is a small, often independent retail store that offers upscale gourmet foods that may be either prepackaged or locally sourced.

The term was coined in 2022 by brand designer Neil Shankar on TikTok under the username "Tall Neil" and popularized by New York magazine's Grub Street when describing small boutiques selling artisanal foods such as olive oil and tinned fish. These foods often feature colorful branded packaging alongside aggressive social media advertising campaigns.

Shoppy shops claim to offer an alternative shopping experience from traditional retail stores by having a distinctive atmosphere and a local feeling like that of a general store. Shankar described these retail outlets as "a place where you can touch all the products you see on Instagram." They were popularized and promoted in various metro areas of the US throughout 2023 as stores which carried rotating brands. They are often seen as a stepping stone to getting into larger retail marketplaces such as Whole Foods.

Shoppy shops commodify authenticity by emphasizing their small boutique nature as a brand strategy and provide startups with a physical retail outlet. In response to shoppy shop marketing, some private labels have rebranded to better match their counterparts' aesthetics. WNYC investigated the phenomenon in 2023 and concluded "many of these highly curated shops... are actually getting their goods through a network of venture capital-funded Insta-brands."
