= One World Cafe =

Former cafe in Salt Lake City

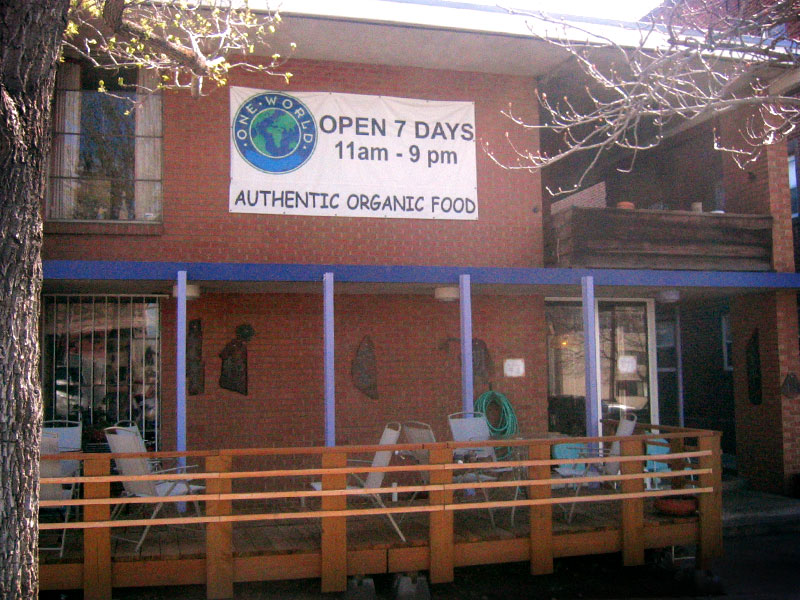
- Storefront in April 2007
- Interactive map of One World Cafe

Restaurant information
- Established: 2003
- Closed: 2012
- Location: Salt Lake City, Utah
- Coordinates: 40°46′05.5″N 111°52′56″W

One World Cafe was a nonprofit community kitchen and a predecessor to the One World Everybody Eats (OWEE) foundation based in Salt Lake City, Utah, United States. Its motto was "a hand up, not a hand out." The community kitchen concept is a restaurant based on a gift economy, allowing patrons to "pay or donate what they can" and serves all members of the community regardless of their ability to pay. The Cafe incorporated volunteer and common-effort aspects similar to those of a community garden. The organization's goal was to provide all diners with high-quality, all-natural, and simple food by asking patrons who are able to contribute to do so. In 2012, the cafe closed as the owner, Denise Cerreta, chose to focus on helping other communities, replicating their One World Cafe model in their larger foundation.

== Operation ==
The cafe was a for-profit business but served food according to a pay-what-you-want model.

If customers could not afford to pay, they had the option to volunteer at the cafe doing dishes, cooking, or working in the garden, and receive meal vouchers in exchange for the work they performed. Patrons could also pay for a meal by donating supplies or organically grown produce to the cafe. A wish list was maintained in the cafe for those interested in donating specific supplies. One World Cafe did not turn anyone away for inability to pay. All patrons were asked to give fairly in exchange for their meal, but operations ultimately relied on a gift economy and honor system.

== Fare ==
The cafe served an organic, natural, and local cuisine that included vegan, vegetarian, and meat dishes. There was no standard menu and the encouraged price changed daily depending on the availability of local food (often donations from patrons) and the Chef's inspiration. The One World Cafe specialized in "home-style" dishes from around the world featuring staples such as bread, soup, salad, entree, organic coffees and teas, dessert, grains, quiche, and dal and rice. The cafe purchased foodstuffs locally whenever possible.

== History ==
The One World Cafe was founded by Denise Cerreta in 2003 and was one of the first pay-what-you-can cafes in the world.

In 2009, One World founder Denise Cerreta stepped down from the daily operation of the cafe in order to focus on helping other communities open restaurants using the OWEE model.

In 2010, the OWEE Foundation began hosting a yearly summit in January for entrepreneurs with restaurants based on One World's model, as well as those interested in starting one.

In 2011, the cafe started to experience economic troubles, and employees staged a walkout as checks bounced. The cafe fired the longtime manager and tried to continue business as usual.

In 2012, the original Salt Lake City location closed administration transitioned their manpower to creating the One World Everybody Eats Foundation with a mission focused on helping people start their own community kitchens.

In 2017, Cerreta was nominated and awarded the James Beard Foundation's Humanitarian of the Year Award.

== Challenges ==
Cafes that rely on a "pay what you can" model are naturally going to feel the pressures of economic ups and downs, as their source of income is reliant on whether patrons feel able to pay. Many OWEE model restaurants are registered 501 (c)(3) nonprofits that receive federal funding and are not established enough to withstand federal changes. Another challenge is inflation. As prices of food and produce increase, as well as rent, these organizations are vulnerable to having to permanently shut down or having to change locations. Changing locations impacts the unhoused or low-income community that these institutions aim to serve, as they may rely on public transportation and reliability for a food source. Gracefull Cafe in Littlewood, Colorado, closed after 8 years of service when rising costs and a shifting economy became unsustainable.

People tend to feel ashamed about needing financial assistance, and there is substantial stigma surrounding "handouts". This can pose a real risk to OWEE cafes that rely on the consumers coming in and viewing the restaurant as a palatable place to eat.

== Impact ==
One World Cafe was the originator when it comes to community cafes within the US. Cafes all over the country drew inspiration from or were directly mentored by those who started One World. The network of cafes all have missions related to fighting against food insecurity and improving the lives of the disenfranchised within their communities. Meal exchanges "give people a real sense of worth" and provide dignity in ding. The model "appeals to our basic nature to give something back" and empowers those who can to take action within their community to make observable and tangible change.

== See also ==
- Food Not Bombs
- Freeganism
- List of bakery cafés
- Pay what you can
