= Lentil as Anything =

Former Australian restaurant group

Coordinates: 37°52′13.37″S 144°58′51.64″E

Lentil As Anything Inc. (Lentil) was a group of pay what you want, not for profit vegetarian and vegan Australian restaurants founded by Shanaka Fernando. Restaurants were located in Melbourne and Sydney and operated on a similar model to pay what you can. The operation closed in February 2022 due to financial concerns and allegations of mismanagement. Lentil is named after the Australian new wave band Mental As Anything.

== History ==
Lentil was a multicultural, refugee-friendly, organisation founded in September 2000 and was registered with the Australian Charities and Not-for-profits Commission. There were four Lentil locations, the first of which opened in 2000 in St. Kilda and the largest being located at the former Abbotsford Convent. Their most recent restaurant was opened in the Melbourne suburb of Thornbury in 2015. A total of eight restaurants were active before their closure in 2022.

== Dining experience ==
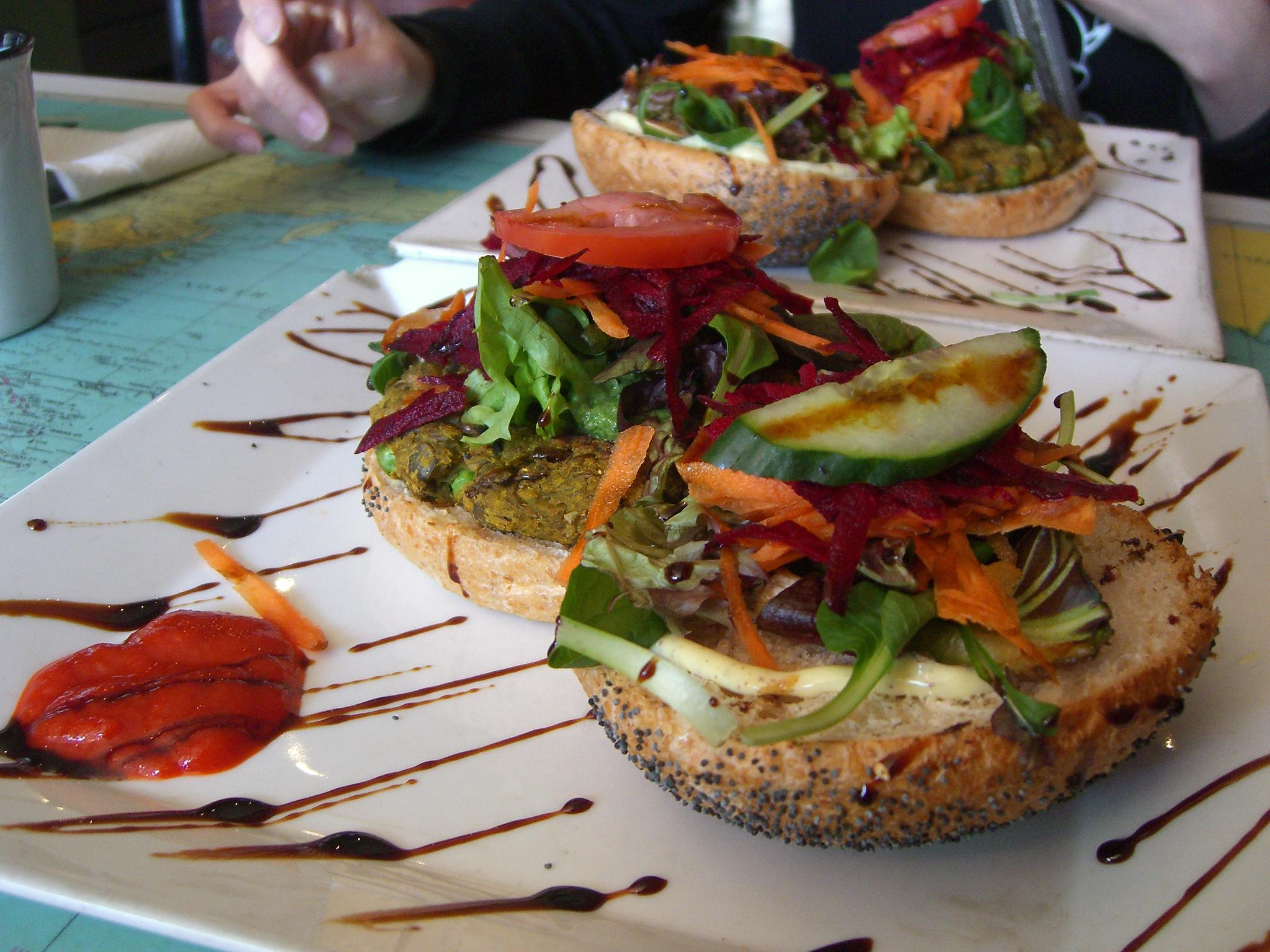
A lentil burger from Lentil As Anything.

Live music, world music, films, and artworks were often performed and displayed at the restaurants, particularly at Abbotsford and Thornbury, where the restaurants became public meeting places with many patrons travelling from the north and east. It notably catered for the Green New Deal Conference in Melbourne in 2009.

== Pay what you feel model ==
The restaurants wholly relied on the generosity of their patrons, volunteers and suppliers to operate. Patrons were asked to "pay what they feel" the meal, service and beverages are worth by contributing an amount of their choice into a box at the counter. The Abbotsford and St. Kilda locations initially faced large financial debt due to mismanagement and other factors, many of which were later resolved.

In 2016, it was reported that its Newtown restaurant was operating at a loss as the average patron payment was less than $3.

Also in 2016, the Abbotsford restaurant introduced a number of changes to prevent freeloading such as no BYO alcohol and asking people to move on if they spent an unreasonable amount of time at the restaurant.

== In the media ==
In 2010, The Naked Lentil, a documentary on the restaurant and its founder Shanaka Fernando was aired by SBS. Fernando (with Greg Hill) published the book Lentil as Anything: Everybody Deserves a Place at the Table in 2012.

== See also ==
- Give-away shop
- List of vegetarian and vegan restaurants
- Retail
- Pay what you want
