= Pay what you want =

Pricing strategy

Pay what you want (or PWYW, also referred to as value-for-value model) is a pricing strategy where buyers pay their desired amount for a given commodity. This amount can sometimes include zero. A minimum (floor) price may be set, and/or a suggested price may be indicated as guidance for the buyer. The buyer can select an amount higher or lower than the standard price for the commodity. Many common PWYW models set the price prior to a purchase (ex ante), but some defer price-setting until after the experience of consumption (ex post) (similar to tipping). PWYW is a buyer-centered form of participative pricing, also referred to as co-pricing (as an aspect of the co-creation of value).

== Motivation ==
PWYW models can sometimes be successful as they eliminate many of the disadvantages of conventional pricing. These models can eliminate fear of whether a product is worth a given set price and the related risk of disappointment ("buyer's remorse"). For sellers it removes the challenging and sometimes costly task of setting the "right" price (which may vary for different market segments). For both buyers and sellers, it changes an adversarial zero-sum conflict centered on price into a friendly win-win exchange centered on value and trust. It also accounts for varying value perceptions and price sensitivities among buyers. While most uses of PWYW have been at the margins of the economy, or for special promotions, there are emerging efforts to expand its utility to broader and more regular use (see "Enhanced forms" below).

Further reasons for sellers to implement PWYW pricing include price discrimination and market penetration. Price discrimination occurs automatically in a PWYW model since buyers with higher valuations of the product will choose to pay a higher price. Thus, price discrimination could result in higher revenues for the seller if costs are sufficiently low. PWYW is also an effective tool for penetrating a new market, perhaps to introduce a new brand, as even consumers with a very low valuation can pay small amounts for the same product.

The success of PWYW models depends on several factors. For one source, a successful PWYW model has:

1. A product with a low marginal cost
2. A fair-minded customer
3. A product that can be sold credibly at a wide range of prices
4. A strong relationship between buyer and seller
5. A very competitive marketplace

This strategy tends to be more effective when relating to digital products or services.

Other names include "pay what you wish", "pay what you like", "pay as you want", "pay what you feel", "pay as you wish", "pay as you like", "pay what you will", and "pay as you will". "Pay what you can" is sometimes used synonymously, but this is more oriented to charity or social uses and based on ability to pay. PWYW is more broadly oriented to perceived value in combination with willingness and ability to pay.

== History and commercial uses ==
PWYW has long existed on the margins of the economy, such as for tips, street performers, and charities. It has been gaining interest in wider industries.

=== Music ===
- Contemporary Christian music artist Keith Green implemented a PWYW structure for his 1980 album So You Wanna Go Back to Egypt. The album was available solely through Green's Last Days Ministries via a mail-order coupon. A purchaser would send the coupon along with the chosen purchase price (if any) to obtain the album.
- In 2005, Jane Siberry pioneered a self-determined pricing policy through her website on which the purchaser is given the choices of: standard price (about US$0.99/track); pay now, self-priced; pay later, self-priced; or "a gift from Jane". In an interview with The Globe and Mail, Siberry confirmed that since she had instituted the self-determined pricing policy, the average income she receives per song from Sheeba customers is in fact slightly more than standard price.
- Jeff Rosenstock, frontman of New York punk bands The Arrogant Sons of Bitches and Bomb the Music Industry!, began releasing music through the website of his digital-only record label Quote Unquote Records in 2005. The first of these releases was the debut Bomb the Music Industry! album, Album Minus Band. Releases on Quote Unquote Records are offered as free downloads with the option of donating to the label. The header of their website reads "The First Ever Donation Based Record Label".
- Bandcamp, a web service launched in 2007 where musicians sell their music to fans or can just upload them for streaming, also allows fans to name their own prices when purchasing music and bands are given the option to set minimum prices for their music and buyers can pay as much over the minimum as they choose to.
- In October 2007, the English band Radiohead released their seventh album, In Rainbows, through their website as a download using a PWYW system. It was the first PWYW release for a major musical act, and created awareness of PWYW models.
- In 2008, Wheatus moved to a PWYW system for all their future and past albums they held the rights to.
- Koo Koo Kanga Roo, a comedy kids/hip hop duo, released all of their recorded music under a PWYW system. The group has referred to themselves strictly as a live band, and thus give away their music solely so as many people as possible can hear it and be able to sing and dance along with it at their performances.
- In 2019, Michael Stipe's debut solo single, "Your Capricious Soul", was offered for under a PWYW model, with a suggested price of 77 cents.

=== Restaurants ===
- One of the earliest known "Pay What Your Heart Feels" initiatives was started in 1984 at Annalakshmi Restaurant at Bangsar, Kuala Lumpur, Malaysia, inspired by Swami Shantananda Saraswati. This concept soon spread to Annalakshmi restaurants located in other cities.
- In 2000, Lentil as Anything opened using a PWYW model in St Kilda, Melbourne, Australia. In subsequent years, more Lentil as Anything restaurants were opened around Melbourne including in Abbotsford Convent, Footscray (now closed) and Thornbury. In 2013 Lentil As Anything opened a restaurant in Newtown Sydney, Australia.
- In 2003, One World Everybody Eats opened in Salt Lake City. The restaurant was closed in 2013.
- From 2006–2007, the Terra Bite Lounge coffeehouse in Kirkland, Washington employed a pay what you want approach for its first year of business, after which it changed to fixed pricing. The coffeehouse has since closed.
- In 2010, Panera Bread used the PWYW system in a St. Louis, Missouri suburb, and generated further attention by opening cafes with similar ideas. The concept cafe was called Panera Cares Community Cafe. In February 2019, the last cafe was shuttered.

=== Software ===
- Freeware applications are frequently distributed under donationware that prompts the user to donate to the author rather than paying for the software, as opposed to the Shareware model.
- Introduced during May 2010, the Humble Indie Bundle was a set of six independently developed digitally downloadable video games which were distributed using a PWYW model (with inclusion of a buyer-controllable charitable contribution). This initial sale raised $1.27 million. They have since released over twenty more bundles, generating over $19 million in total revenues, and in April 2011 securing an investment of $4.7 million from Sequoia Capital.
- In late 2012, McPixel had a PWYW weekend, in partnership with The Pirate Bay, as the creator Mikolaj Kaminski wanted people to try his game to encourage them to buy it.
- Canonical implemented this system on the Ubuntu download page. Their message varies, but usually asks to "Show Ubuntu some love. Or, alternatively, help out in the bug tracker ;)". One can adjust the sum they wish to contribute for each development initiative from $0 to $125. Alternatively, there is an option to skip the payment and go straight to download of selected OS type.

=== Physical goods ===
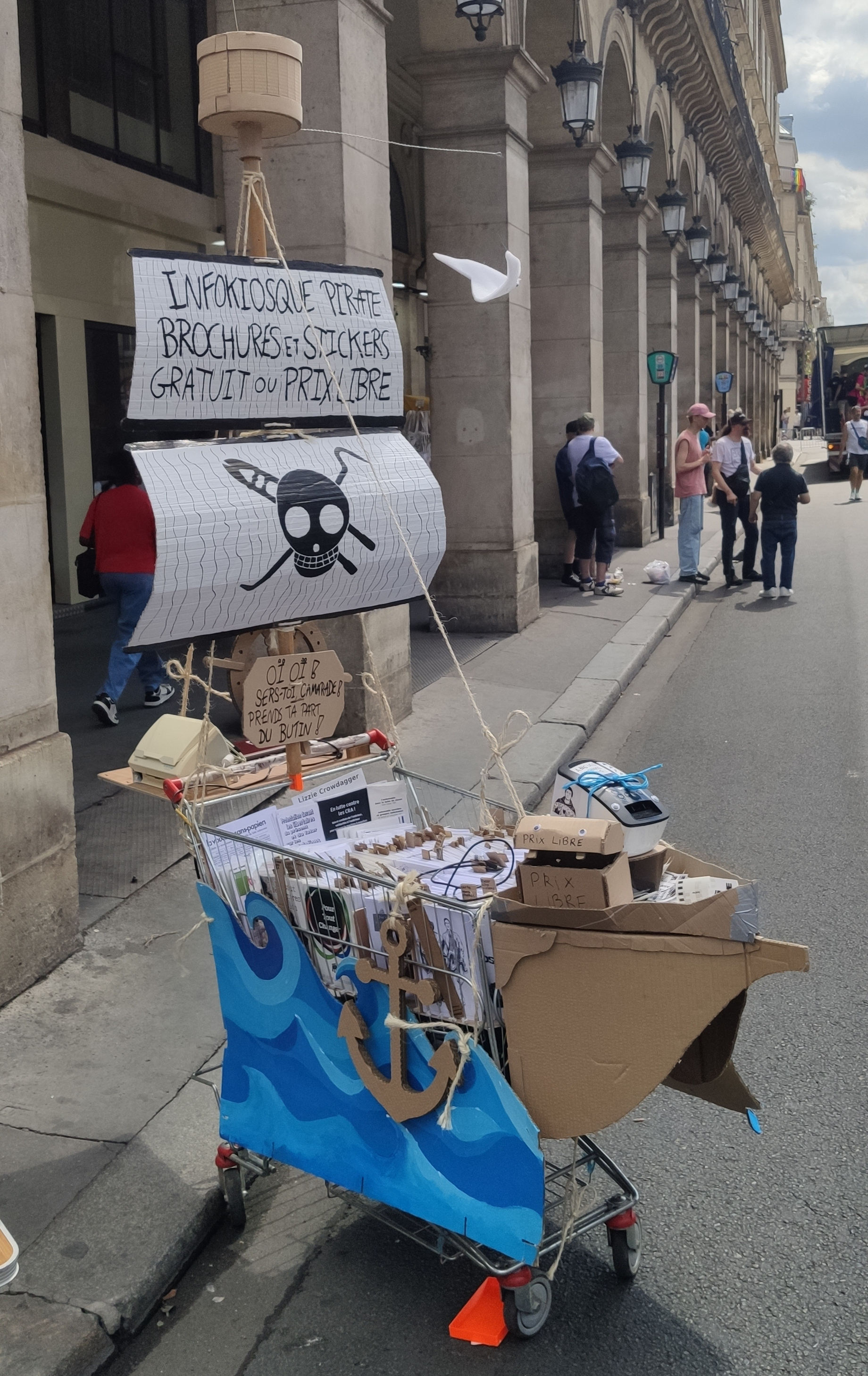
Brochures and stickers being offered for free or "prix libre" (pay what you want) in Paris

- In 2013, Headsets.com offered their customers the PWYW option. CEO Mike Faith noted almost all the company's customers paid full price, with only 10% opting to pay less, saying "Just as money-back guarantees were considered over-generous and dangerous when they were first introduced, they are almost a standard nowadays. There is no reason that trust-based pricing shouldn't become a norm over the next decade."
- In December 2015, Fashion e-tailer Everlane gained significant attention with a PWYW after-Christmas sale that featured clear framing of PWYW pricing options set at three discrete levels that provided 1) only cost recovery, 2) basic overhead recovery, or 3) full sustainable investment.

=== Other ===
- Theaters used PWYW pricing for selected nights.
- In 2013, Panel Syndicate released the webcomic The Private Eye under a PWYW model.
- In 2017, a BIG4 Holiday Park in Australia ran a PWYW pricing strategy for the month of August.
- In the tourism sector, the pay-what-you-want model is commonly used in so-called "free tours", where participants decide how much to pay after the experience. Digital platforms such as GuruWalk facilitate the connection between travelers and local guides operating under this model.

== Research ==
After the Radiohead experiment, economics and business researchers began a flurry of studies, with particular attention to the behavioral economics aspects of PWYW—what motivates buyers to pay more than zero, and how can sellers structure the process to obtain desirable pricing levels? The first studies appeared in 2009: Kim et al. and Regner and Barria.

In 2010, a large-scale experiment was conducted in an amusement park. Ayelet Gneezy, Uri Gneezy, Leif D. Nelson, and Amber Brown tested the effectiveness of PWYW by selling roller coaster photos to park visitors. Their results show although many more people bought the photo under a PWYW model, the average price paid is very low ($0.92), resulting in no income increase for the firm. However, when PWYW was coupled with a charitable cause (buyers were informed they could pay what they wanted AND that half of the paid amount would be donated to a patient support organization) the average amount paid increased substantially (to $6.50). This significantly increased the firm's income, as well as generating a substantial charitable contribution. In a 2012 follow-up research paper, Gneezy and colleagues found PWYW may deter some customers from purchasing. Their results show: "individuals feel bad when they pay less than the 'appropriate' price, causing them to pass on the opportunity to purchase the product altogether".

In a series of controlled laboratory experiments, Klaus M. Schmidt, Martin Spann and Robert Zeithammer (2014) show that outcome-based social preferences and strategic considerations to keep the seller in the market can explain why and how much buyers voluntarily pay to a PWYW seller. They find that PWYW can be viable in a monopolistic market, but is less successful as a competitive strategy because it does not drive traditional posted-price sellers out of the market. Instead, the existence of a posted-price competitor reduces buyers' payments and prevents the PWYW seller from fully penetrating the market. When given the choice, most sellers opt for setting a posted price rather than a PWYW pricing strategy.

Another PWYW experiment looked at determinants for the price chosen by consumers of the application iProduct, which provided tutorials and lessons for potential application developers on the App Store (iOS). The application was offered as free with in-app purchases, including a gratuity mechanism that allowed users to pay/donate what they wanted for the projects included in the app. The study tested the significance of four determinants in deciding the PWYW price paid by consumers: fairness (proper compensation to the seller), loyalty to the seller, price consciousness (focus on paying a low price), and usage (how much the consumer will use the product). The study found that price consciousness negatively influenced the price paid, while usage and loyalty positively influenced the price paid for the product. Fairness was found to have no significant effect.

Further research focused on the long-term perspective of pay what you want. A study conducted by researchers of the Ruhr-University of Bochum examines repeated transactions in a pay what you want environment. By using latent growth modeling they find that the average price paid decreases significantly; yet the decrease in price paid reduces with every transaction. They further show customers' preference for fairness and price conscientiousness influence the steepness of the individual price curves.

A broad review of the literature on PWYW and related forms of voluntary payment (tipping, donations, and gifts) by Natter and Kaufmann, published in 2015, examines many relevant factors as they relate to voluntary pricing strategies. These factors include product characteristics, consumer-related characteristics, situational variables, relational techniques, and reference prices. The review also addresses economic and communicative success, and underlying market motives.

== Enhanced forms ==
There are several changes to the PWYW model which can improve its profitability while maintaining its buyer appeal.

=== Ex post pricing ===
One simple enhancement is to shift the time of pricing from the usual practice of ex ante pricing, which is done at the initiation of a transaction and prior to the consumption experience, to ex post pricing, which defers pricing to a follow-up step after the consumption experience. A commercial use that offers this payment choice is Ebook seller OpenBooks.com.

Post-pricing separates the buying decision and the pricing decision. Consuming a product, call it a good, reduces information asymmetries about the good's quality, so the buyer is informed of the product's quality when they decide what to pay. Risk-averse buyers who would not purchase the good at a fixed price for fear of its quality (or would price at a discount in an ex ante PWYW system) can be enticed to purchase the product using an ex post PWYW system. The ex post PWYW system works as a signal of quality to attract risk-averse buyers. This might be a profitable strategy if it attracts risk-averse buyers, increasing the consumer base and allowing economies of scale in production.

=== Charity elements ===
Another enhancement is to add a charity element when selling digital content. This is used in the Humble Indie Bundle, which has a buyer-directed charity component to further increase buyer willingness to pay. This charity effect is similar to the research study noted in the Research section above. Humble Bundle also encourages buyers to "beat the average" by adding additional content for customers who pay above the current average purchase price.

=== Repeated transactions ===
A further enhancement is to use a series of repeated transactions. This is called FairPay ("Fair PWYW"). This shifts the scope from a single digital content transaction to an ongoing relationship over a series of transactions. It builds on the benefits of ex post PWYW pricing (setting the price after consumption, when product's value is known) and adds a feedback process for tracking individual buyers' reputations for paying fairly, as assessed by the seller. It then uses the fairness reputation data to let the seller determine what further offers to extend to that particular buyer. It seeks to incentivize fair pricing by buyers (to maintain a good reputation, and thus be eligible for future offers), and to enable sellers to limit their risk on each transaction in accord with the buyer's reputation. The Fair PWYW architecture and how it builds on modern digital content pricing strategy has been outlined on the Harvard Business Review Blog. Fair PWYW integrates PWYW into a feedback/control cycle which tries to create value for both the buyer and seller. It attempts to reflect the customer's dynamic perceptions of value and real willingness to pay - this enables it to optimize co-creation of customer value over the course of the buyer and seller's relationship.

== See also ==
- Co-creation
- Freemium
- Honor system
- Pay what you can
- Price discrimination
- Pricing methods
- Proof-of-payment
- Sliding scale fees
- Busking
