= GuruWalk =

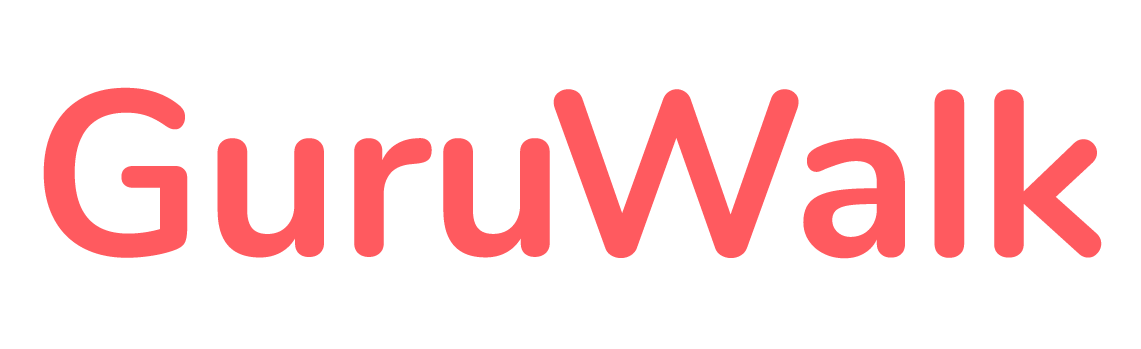
- Website type: Online marketplace
- Founded: 14 December 2017; 8 years ago
- Headquarters: Valencia, Spain
- Area served: Worldwide
- Founder: Juan Castillo López
- Key people: Juan Castillo López (CEO)
- Industry: Tourism, travel technology
- Products: Free walking tours, tourist activities
- Website: www.guruwalk.com

GuruWalk is an online marketplace for the tourism sector, connecting local guides with travellers. The platform uses a 'pay what you want' model, which is common in 'free tours' (users book for free and tip the guide voluntarily afterwards).

== History ==
GuruWalk was launched in 2017, after being founded by Juan Castillo López in Valencia (Spain), as a platform designed to connect independent tour guides with travellers interested in city tours.

In 2019, the company secured funding in a first round involving private investors and organisations linked to the start-up ecosystem.

During the COVID-19 pandemic, which particularly affected the tourism sector, GuruWalk achieved record turnover figures. By then, the platform was operating in multiple cities internationally. Its expansion, and that of other platforms, has been linked to the growth of digital tourism intermediation services.

In 2025, the company was selected to participate in Euronext’s IPO Ready programme, designed to prepare companies for potential initial public offerings.

== Business model ==
GuruWalk is a digital platform that connects tour guides with users. The platform enables travellers to book tours without paying anything upfront, while guides earn income through voluntary contributions from participants. The company generates revenue through commissions applied to managed bookings.

This model is considered to fall within the scope of the platform economy as applied to urban tourism, and has been analysed in specialist industry publications.

== Controversies ==
The growth of free tour platforms has sparked debate within the tourism sector. Professional guide associations have criticised this model, arguing that it could allow unaccredited guides to operate in certain destinations. These groups claim that this raises issues regarding tourism regulation and competition within the sector.

Some analyses of the tourism sector have noted that the growth of these platforms is part of wider changes related to the platform economy and the greater flexibility of tourism services. Platforms such as GuruWalk have stated that guides operating through their services must comply with local regulations applicable to each destination.

== Initiatives and reception ==
In 2024, following the floods caused by a cold drop or 'dana' in the Valencian Community, the company launched a solidarity-based mobility initiative via a car-sharing platform to help those affected.

Various international media outlets, including Time Out, Infobae and Islands Magazine, have cited some data on urban tourism and pedestrian-friendly cities compiled by GuruWalk. Press publications, mainly in Latin America, have featured the rankings and lists compiled by the platform.
