= Pay what you can =

Business model

Pay what you can (PWYC) is a non-profit or for-profit business model which does not depend on set prices for its goods, but instead asks customers to pay what they feel the product or service is worth to them. It is often used as a promotional tactic, but can also be the regular method of doing business. It is a variation on the gift economy and cross-subsidization, in that it depends on reciprocity and trust to succeed.

"Pay what you want" is sometimes used synonymously, but "pay what you can" is often more oriented to charity or socially oriented uses, based more on ability to pay, while "pay what you want" is often more broadly oriented to perceived value in combination with willingness and ability to pay.

== Motivation ==
Giving buyers the ability and freedom to decide what they are willing to pay for can be very successful, this eliminates the issues of conservative pricing. Buyers are attracted to the fact they are not obligated to pay a certain price for a product, this eliminates all issues of an item becoming overpriced in the consumer's eyes, the customer can then make their own judgment on what the product is actually worth.

== Advantages ==
- Entices members of the public to engage with the business or organization (potential future customers).
- Attracts a large number of potential customers from friends and families of current customers (word of mouth).
- Great way of free market research and immediate feedback for the business or organization. For example, if a private bookshop was selling its own published books and the customer valued it at £10 ($15) rather than say £4 ($6.15) and was willing to pay that, this would display positive feedback for the company. The organisation could then use this information for personal statistics and data.
- No barriers to entry, allowing customers to try the product or service for nothing.
- Differentiates the business from other competitors - a unique selling point.

== Examples ==
- A Place at the Table
- American Museum of Natural History
- Grace Ndiritu - COVERSLUT© fashion project
- FC United of Manchester's Season Ticket policy
- Freeware Applications
- Humble Bundle
- In Rainbows – An album by Radiohead
- Lentil as Anything
- One World Cafe
- Panera Cares community cafés
- Paste Magazine
- Pink Peacock café
- SAME Cafe
- A Little Cabin in the Alps

== See also ==
- Pay what you want
- Price discrimination
- Sliding scale fees
