= Food Not Bombs =

Group of independent collectives serving free food

- Official logo

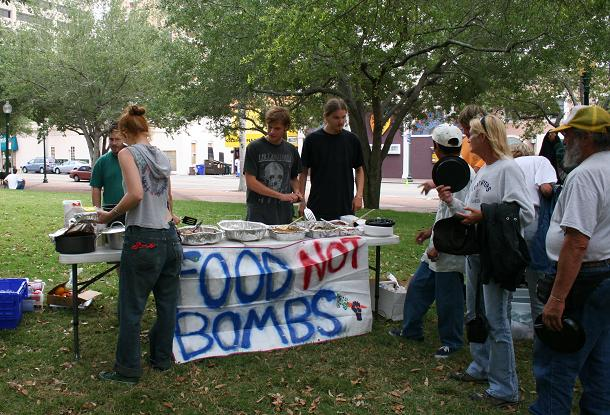
- A FNB foodshare in Sarasota, Florida
- Formation: c. 1980
- Founded at: Cambridge, Massachusetts, U.S.
- Type: Franchise activism
- Website: http://foodnotbombs.net

Food Not Bombs (FNB) is a loose-knit group of independent collectives that distribute free, usually vegan and vegetarian food. This food is typically sourced from donations or from salvaging and then served in public spaces or at activist gatherings. There are about 1,000 FNB collectives in about 60 countries around the world. It is often considered an anarchist or anarchist-inspired group, as well as a form of franchise activism.

The first FNB collective was founded in Cambridge, Massachusetts, by members of the anti-nuclear movement. After hosting a soup kitchen as a form of "street theater", the group dedicated themselves to feeding people full time. In the late 1980s, FNB co-founder Keith McHenry moved to San Francisco, where he founded a second FNB collective amidst a mass homelessness crisis in the area. By the early 1990s, there were about 30 active FNB collectives in both the United States and Canada. Soon after FNB's first international gathering in 1992, more collectives were founded in cities across the world.

FNB collectives have been involved in many mass protest movements, including the anti-globalization movement, the Occupy movement, the Black Lives Matter movement, and the Gaza war protests, often participating in demonstrations and feeding protesters. Some collectives have faced legal reprisals such as tickets and arrests for their foodshares, often due to city permitting laws.

FNB's principles include veganism, vegetarianism, the distribution of free food, group autonomy, consensus decision-making, and nonviolent direct action. Many of its members are migrant workers, punks, underemployed people, unhoused people, and university students organized as unpaid volunteers. Some scholars note the transgressive nature of FNB's activism. Most Food Not Bombs volunteers consider what they are doing as a form of mutual aid.

== History ==
=== Background ===
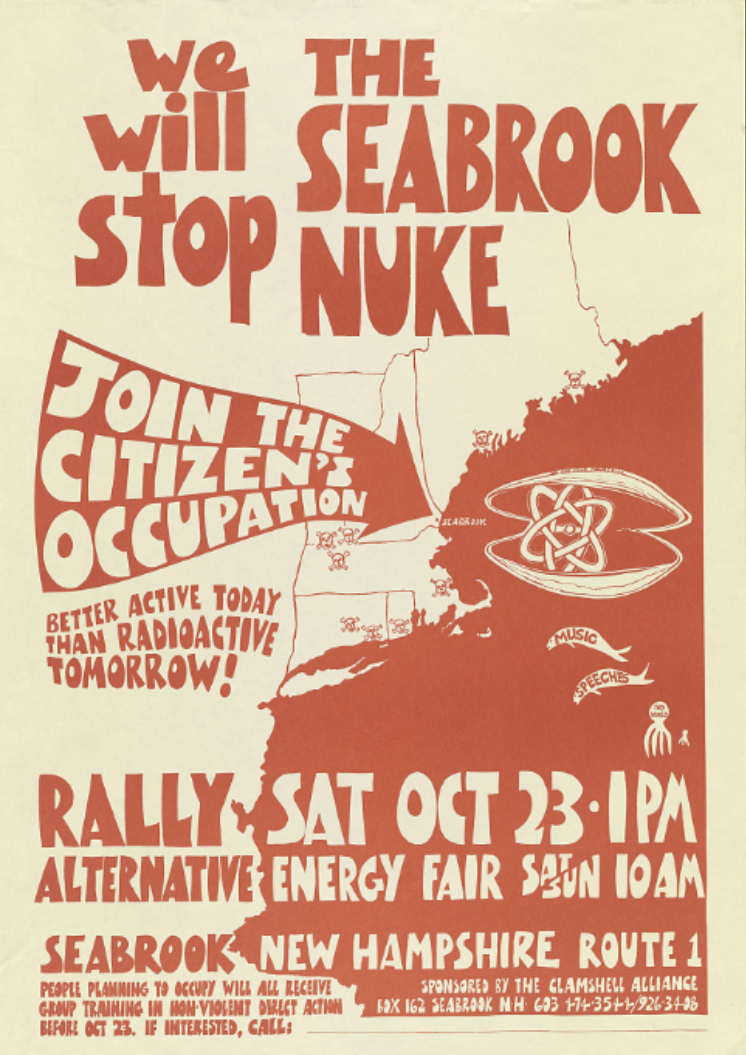
The founding members of FNB were members of the Coalition for Direct Action at Seabrook, an offshoot of the Clamshell Alliance

During the early 1960s, the New Left emerged as a social force in the United States. Associated with groups like the Students for a Democratic Society (SDS), the Student Nonviolent Coordinating Committee (SNCC), and the Congress of Racial Equality (CORE), the New Left advocated for participatory democracy and greater rights for minorities while opposing the Vietnam War. By the late 1970s, many New Left groups had fractured. However, a new style of radicalism also emerged during the 1970s. This style was defined by its belief in decentralized structures, feminist-inspired politics, and the use of anarchist methods like affinity groups and direct action.

Many activists from the 1970s anti-nuclear movement adopted this style. Among these activists, members of the Clamshell Alliance, originally founded in 1976 to oppose the construction of the Seabrook Station Nuclear Power Plant in New Hampshire, protested against the nuclear power industry using direct action tactics such as occupations and guerrilla gardening. Between 1976 and 1977, the alliance occupied the Seabrook plant three times. In 1979, after a debate about another potential occupation, (Note: The group in favor of the occupation called for cutting the fences around the plant to gain entry and wearing helmets and gas masks for protection. The group opposed argued that cutting fences was a form of violence and that wearing protective clothing would provoke police violence.) an alliance faction split off to form the Coalition for Direct Action at Seabrook, which organized two failed occupation attempts: one in 1979 and one in 1980.

=== Origins ===
During the 1980 occupation, coalition member Brian Feigenbaum was arrested and charged with assaulting a police officer. To raise money to cover his legal expenses, a group of coalition members (Note: This group included Amy Rothstein, C.T. Lawrence Butler, Jessie Constable, Jo Swanson, Keith McHenry, Mira Brown, and Susan Eaton.) in Boston and Cambridge, Massachusetts organized a bake sale. Dressed in military uniforms and holding a sign that said, "I'm waiting for the day when schools get all the money they need and the Air Force has to hold a bake sale for a bomber", they sold pastries in Boston. (Note: This was their second attempt to organize a bake sale for Fiegenbaulm. The first had not been successful.)

On March 26, 1981, after Feigenbaum was released, the group organized a soup kitchen across from the First National Bank of Boston, which was one of the sponsors for the Seabrook plant. Dressed as "hobos", they hoped to evoke the soup kitchens of the Great Depression through what one of the group's members, Keith McHenry, later called "street theater". They also handed out leaflets saying that contemporary government policies would lead to widespread homelessness. Between 50 and 70 people ate at the kitchen, (Note: "At least 50" according to researcher and FNB volunteer Sean Parson and 70 according to researcher Drew Robert Winter.) and soon after, the group decided to dedicate themselves to feeding people full time.

Around this time, McHenry was working at the organic food cooperative Bread and Circus, often salvaging food from the cooperative to donate to a local housing project. The headquarters for Draper Laboratory, which designed guidance systems for intercontinental ballistic missiles, was located across the street from this housing project. According to McHenry, this was the inspiration for the name Food Not Bombs (FNB).

=== Early years ===
During its first two years, FNB primarily focused on bulk food distribution, food tables, and distributing literature. Its members squatted in a house on Harvard Street, collecting food salvage and seeking donations from health food stores. They then redistributed this food to drug rehabilitation clinics, immigrant rights organizations, service groups for homeless people, soup kitchens, and Rosie's Place, a local women's shelter. They also provided free vegan meals in Harvard Square every Monday and participated in marches against nuclear weapons, including the March for Nuclear Disarmament in New York City. This march took place on June 12, 1982, and was the biggest protest in the history of the United States at the time. (Note: Estimates of the number of attendees vary. Researcher Matthew Armstrong estimates the number at "upwards of 500,000". Researcher L. Bruce van Voorst estimates the number at around 750,000. Henry Richard Maar III estimates the number at "more than one million".) That year, FNB also sponsored a "Free Concert for Nuclear Disarmament" in Boston and participated in a 10-day protest against Reaganomics at Boston Common, providing meals to protesters.

In the late 1980s, FNB began focusing on United States interventions in Central America. In 1985, it helped organize an occupation of the John F. Kennedy Federal Building to protest President Ronald Reagan's Central America policy. (Note: McHenry says that the occupation was a protest against United States intervention in the Salvadoran Civil War. However, a contemporary news story says that the occupation was also protesting a trade ban on Nicaragua.) When PepsiCo set up a tent where people could participate in the Pepsi Challenge next to an FNB tent, FNB organized a "tofu smoothie challenge", distributing tofu smoothies and brochures on the Coca-Cola Company's deployment of death squads against Guatemalan labor organizers while criticizing Pepsi's lack of nutrition. It also produced several films about United States intervention in the Salvadoran Civil War.

=== Spread to California ===
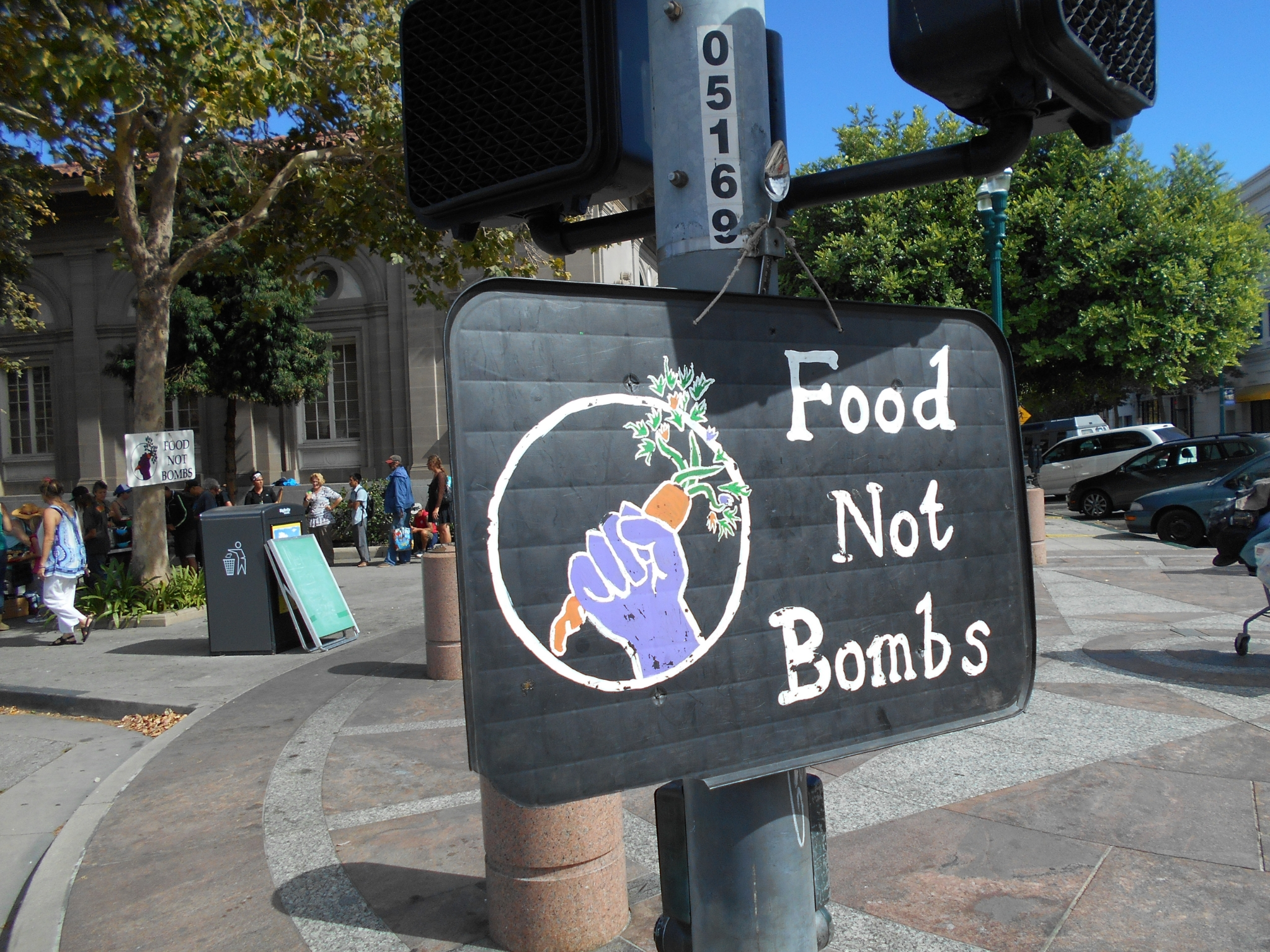
An FNB sign in Santa Cruz, California. The group spread to California in the late 1980s.

In 1987 or 1988, (Note: 1987 according to Parson. 1988 according to researchers Drew Robert Winter and David Boarder Giles.) McHenry moved to San Francisco, where he founded a second FNB collective. Management of the Boston collective was assumed by Eric Weinberger, a retired accountant and community activist from Chicago. According to McHenry, the San Francisco collective was inspired by peace activist Brian Willson, who had had his legs severed by a train during a rail blockade along the Sacramento River. As one of its first actions, the San Francisco collective worked with the anti-nuclear organization American Peace Test to distribute food to protesters at the Nevada Test Site. There, its members encountered a Long Beach group called "Bread Not Bombs", inspired by FNB Cambridge. This group became the third FNB collective.

By the 1980s, San Francisco was experiencing a mass homelessness crisis due to stagnating wages, high housing prices and unemployment, mass evictions, a decline in apartment hotels and other public housing options, and Reagan-era welfare state rollbacks. Many of the newly homeless needed food, and FNB activists noted that there were no organizations providing free meals in the Haight-Ashbury district. As a result, the San Francisco collective began regularly serving food at the intersection of Haight and Stanyan Streets, near Golden Gate Park.

==== Permitting controversy ====
FNB San Francisco struggled to obtain a permit for its Haight-Ashbury kitchen, with police arguing that the foodshares drew substance abusers and other "troublemakers" to the park and asking FNB to relocate its services to nearby Hamilton Methodist Church. Meanwhile, McHenry argued that a more visible public site was necessary for the collective to operate. On August 15, 1988, a group of 45 riot police arrested 9 FNB activists (Note: Parson says 15 activists were arrested. However, Gordon, McHenry, Winter, and Boarder Giles say that it was 9.) for serving food without a permit. Photos of the arrests were published in the San Francisco Chronicle, and a week later, between 150 and 200 people (Note: 150 according to Winter. 200 according to McHenry and Boarder Giles.) marched through the Haight-Ashbury district to protest the arrests. 29 of these protesters were arrested. While protests against the San Francisco Police Department (SFPD) continued to escalate, the department defended the arrests, with an SFPD public relations officer arguing that FNB was making a "political statement", not just giving away food. Ultimately, in September 1988, Art Agnos, the mayor of San Francisco, issued a 60-day permit to FNB to distribute food at the intersection of Stanyan and Page Streets. A second permit was issued on February 1, 1989.

On June 28, 1989, FNB San Francisco organized a 24-hour soup kitchen for a tent city protest at Civic Center Plaza, in front of San Francisco City Hall. The encampment, called Camp Agnos, protested what they perceived as the city's failure to address homelessness and high housing prices. After FNB occupied Agnos's office as part of the protest, the city filed an injunction against it for serving food in the plaza and revoked its permit to serve food near Golden Gate Park. It later regained this permit and also received a permit to serve food at the Civic Center Plaza, but these permits were also revoked on July 6, 1990, with the passage of a law making it more difficult to obtain food distribution permits in the city. On January 25, 1991, McHenry was charged with contempt of court for breaking the city's injunction and on February 14, asked to serve 40 days in jail. On March 22, the injunction was dropped.

=== Global spread ===
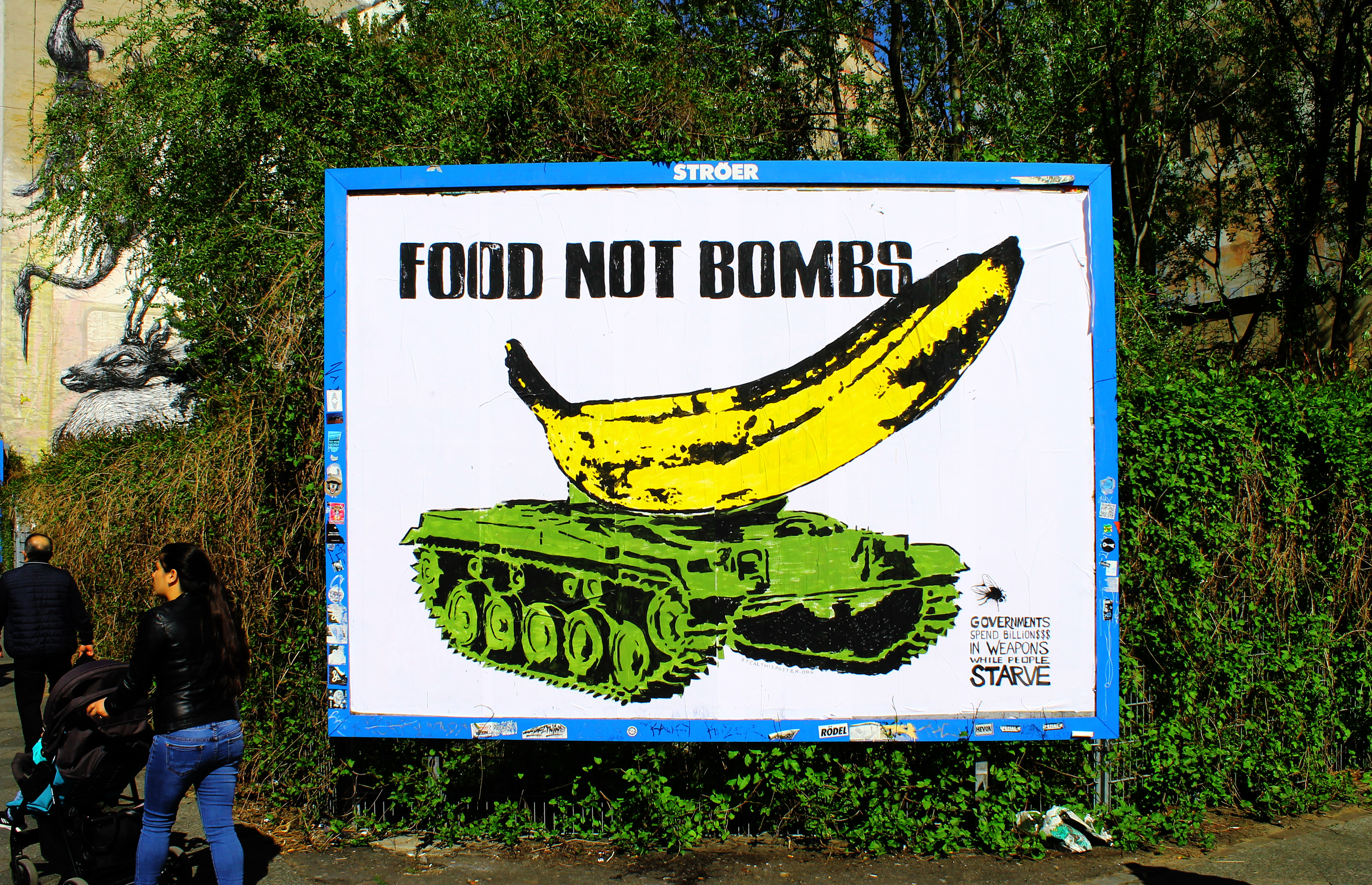
An FNB mural in Berlin

On October 9, 1992, FNB held its first international gathering in San Francisco. About 75 people attended the gathering from about 30 active FNB collectives, including several from Canada. During this gathering, FNB activists outlined the group's guiding principles. After this meeting, FNB activists served food to activists from the American Indian Movement who had come to protest the Columbus quincentennial celebrations being held in the city.

Soon after this first gathering, FNB collectives were founded in London, Melbourne, Montreal, Prague, and in cities across the United States. Over 600 people attended a second international gathering in San Francisco in 1994, which consisted of ten days of workshops, protests, street theater, and tent cities.

=== Frank Jordan protests ===
After becoming mayor of San Francisco in 1992, Frank Jordan stepped up anti-homeless measures as part of his "Matrix" program, which was intended to remove homeless encampments from public areas in the city center. FNB activists recorded police officers confiscating homeless people's shoes and sleeping bags and abducting their pets. By 1994, FNB activists in San Francisco were regularly being arrested and beaten by police, causing them to appeal to President Bill Clinton's Civil Rights Division for aid, which it did not send.

In 1995, about 600 people protested outside throughout San Francisco during a city festival celebrating the 50th anniversary of the founding of the United Nations. These protesters included FNB activists, (Note: Prior to the celebrations, police staged what journalist Clarence Johnson called an "aggressive campaign" against the city's homeless.) AIDS activists, and activists calling for the release of Mumia Abu-Jamal. Nearly 280 protesters were arrested on felony charges, with FNB member MacDonald Scott stating that he was attacked by riot police wielding batons.

In the aftermath of these arrests, human rights organization Amnesty International wrote to California Governor Pete Wilson threatening to designate the arrested protesters as prisoners of conscience. FNB continued to stage protests against Jordan's anti-homeless measures, and that year, Jordan lost his bid for re-election. Researcher and FNB volunteer Sean Parson argues that FNB contributed to his defeat. During a mayoral debate hosted by the San Francisco Chronicle, candidates were asked what they would do about FNB, with only Jordan saying that he would continue to arrest them.

=== Anti-globalization movement ===
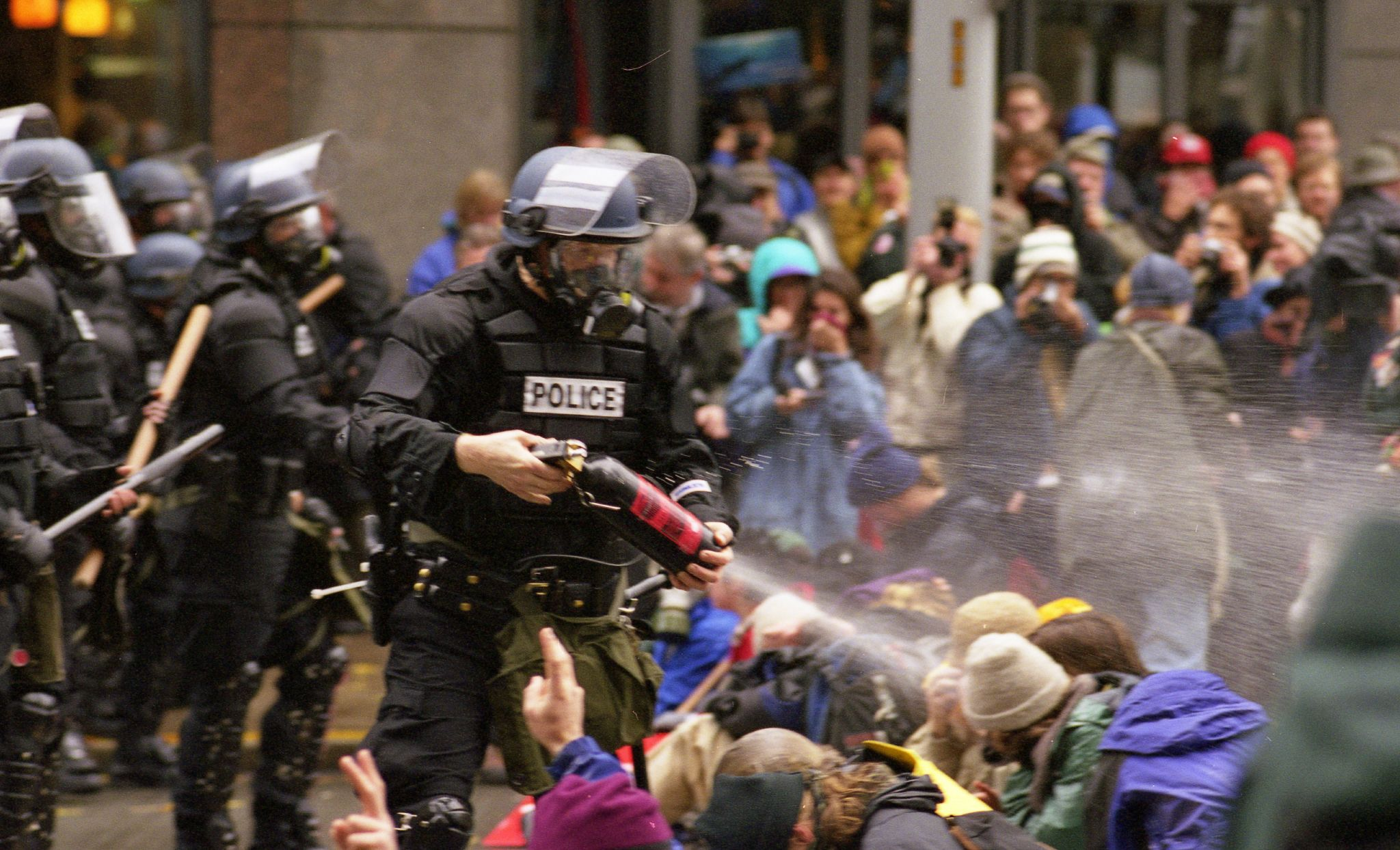
FNB collectives from across the United States coordinated food distribution during the 1999 Seattle WTO protests.

During the 1990s, the anti-globalization movement, which opposed unrestricted investment and trade, emerged. In 1997, FNB activists in Vancouver, Canada, distributed food during the "Unfree Trade Tour", which culminated in a series of public presentations at the Carnegie Community Centre protesting globalization in Basque Country, San Francisco, Spain, and Vancouver. Later, during the 1999 Seattle WTO protests, also known as the "Battle of Seattle", over 50,000 people protested against the World Trade Organization (WTO) during its 1999 Ministerial Conference, with FNB collectives from across the United States coordinating food distribution for these protesters by forming mobile "food units". FNB continued to provide food for later anti-globalization protests. At a 2001 protest in Gothenburg, Sweden, Hannes Westberg, the 19-year-old co-founder of FNB Gothenburg, was shot in the chest by police and imprisoned for five months.

=== Nigeria tour ===
In 2005, McHenry was invited to Lagos, Nigeria speak at a Mahatma Gandhi memorial lecture. Members of the National Association of Nigerian Students (NANS) were also slated to speak at this lecture and, according to one NANS member, were impressed by McHenry's talk. As a result, NANS adopted a resolution to work with FNB to "facilitat[e] peace" in Nigeria. It also invited McHenry to return to Nigeria for a tour in 2006. The tour began on February 15, with McHenry and FNB activist Jill Gwinn arriving alongside Australian journalist Liz Tadic. The group visited Katsina-Ala, Calabar, Port Harcourt, Onitsha, Abuja, and Lagos, with McHenry giving public speeches and interviews, attending lectures, and meeting with farmers and government and university officials. After the tour ended on March 7, local FNB activists planned a second "consolidation tour" of new chapters founded throughout the country and in October, organized an FNB conference in Lagos.

=== Sagada 11 campaign ===
In February 2006, after playing a gig in Gerona, Philippines, a group of 11 punk musicians and FNB volunteers decided to travel to Baguio to attend the Panagbenga Festival. After arriving early on February 12, they decided to hitchhike to Sagada. On February 14, they were stopped at a police checkpoint in Buguias, where they were captured, beaten, and taken to a military outpost. There, they were accused of being members of the New People's Army, which had recently raided a military outpost in Mankayan, and tortured into confessing. According to a report by the World Organisation Against Torture, they were blindfolded and electrocuted, with some being partially buried alive and one being struck in the genitals with wood. According to reporting from Bulatlat, one of the musicians, a 15-year-old girl, was forced to bathe in cold water and choked with a plastic bag.

After the musicians' capture, FNB started the "Sagada 11" campaign to advocate for their release. By March 11, an FNB petition to free the Sagada 11 had received over 1,000 signatures from private individuals and organizations, including Earth First! Philippines, Local Anarchist Network, Not for Sale, and Project Aperture. On its website, FNB also encouraged members to protest outside of Philippine embassies and to send letters to the Philippine Secretary of Justice, Raul M. Gonzalez. Two of the Sagada 11, both minors, were freed on May 30 after the passage of the Juvenile Justice and Welfare Act, which exempts minors from criminal liability. Three others were cleared of wrongdoing by the Benguet regional trial court in June. The remainder were freed by around January 2007.

=== Orlando sharing ban ===
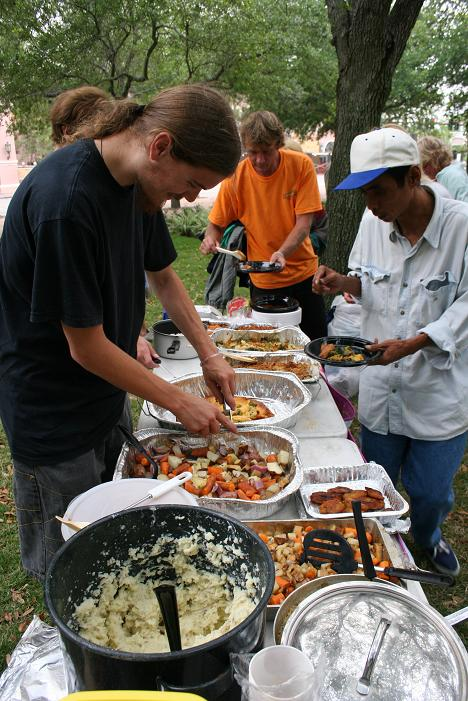
An FNB foodshare in Sarasota, Florida

In April 2007, Eric Montanez, an FNB volunteer in Orlando, Florida, was arrested for violating an ordinance prohibiting the distribution of food to groups of 25 or more people without a permit. (Note: The city allowed groups to receive two permits each year.) On October 10, a jury acquitted him. Soon after, FNB sued the city in conjunction with the First Vagabonds Church of God, a Christian homeless ministry. In 2008, district judge Gregory A. Presnell declared the ordinance unconstitutional on the grounds that it violated the groups' First Amendment right to free speech. The city appealed to the United States Court of Appeals for the Eleventh Circuit, which ruled that the ordinance was constitutional in July 2010. However, in August, the court prohibited the city from enforcing the ordinance until a 10-judge panel could be convened.

On April 12, 2011, the court ruled that the city adequately protected FNB's First Amendment rights by allowing it to hold foodshares twice a year per park. That May, McHenry toured the state, providing support to local chapters and talking about FNB's beliefs and history. In June, police began arresting FNB members, and McHenry was arrested on June 22, spending 17 days in an Orange County jail. On June 16, FNB Orlando's attorney, Shayan Elahi, issued a cease and desist order to the city, arguing that the arrests violated a municipal order prohibiting the physical arrest of individuals who violated a county or municipal ordinance, instead requiring them to appear in court. A spokesman for the city argued that FNB's foodshares led to an increase in crime, trash, and public urination in the city's parks. The mayor of Orlando, Buddy Dyer, called FNB "food terrorists". In response to Dyer's comment, FNB activist Benjamin Markeson filed a defamation suit, and the Florida Civil Rights Association demanded a formal apology.

On June 23, Christopher Doyon (also known as "Commander X"), a member of an Anonymous-friendly hacktivist group called the People's Liberation Front, began #OpOrlando in support of the homeless people FNB fed. As part of #OpOrlando, Doyon and other activists took down one Orlando-related website every day, including the city's official website, the Orlando Chamber of Commerce website, and an independent website aimed at tourists. Each website was taken for 15 minutes or less each, costing the city hundreds of staff hours and roughly US$100,000 to improve its cybersecurity technology. On August 19, Dyer announced that charges against FNB volunteers arrested in Lake Eola Park in Orlando would be dropped in exchange for an agreement that FNB would host its feedings at Orlando City Hall instead of the park.

=== Occupy movement ===
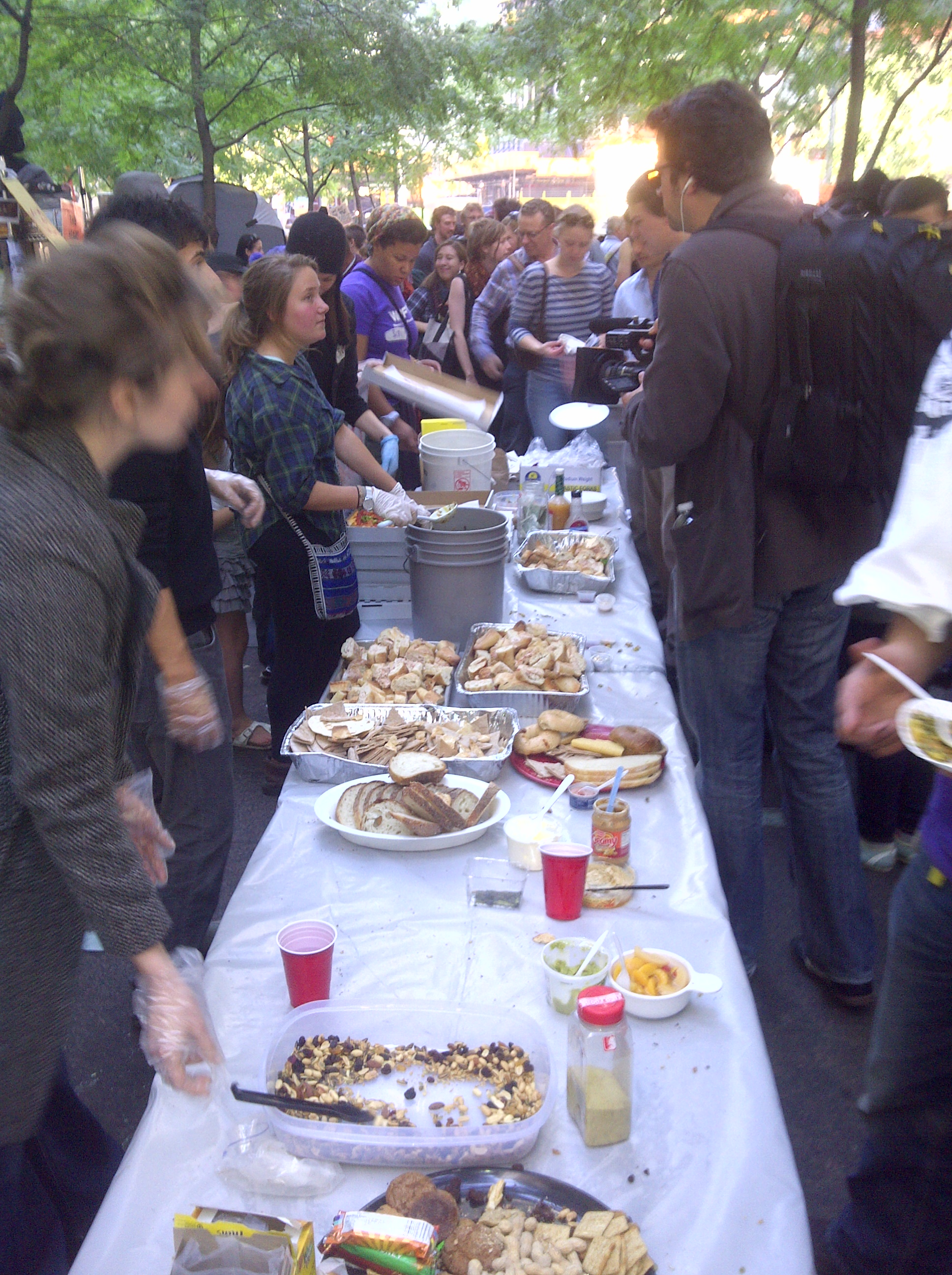
FNB formed the basis for Occupy Wall Street's Food Working Group, which served three meals a day to occupiers.

Beginning on September 17, 2011, protesters occupied Zuccotti Park in Lower Manhattan, New York City. Calling themselves Occupy Wall Street, these protesters remained in the park for two months, igniting similar actions in countries around the world. FNB New York City, which usually cooked meals from the ABC No Rio building, formed the basis for Occupy Wall Street's Food Working Group, creating the "People's Kitchen", which served three meals a day to the protesters. Meals typically included bagels, coffee, and fruit for breakfast; salads and sandwiches for lunch; and pasta or rice and beans for dinner. FNB activists were also the primary organizers of financial and in-kind donations to the occupation. Occupy Wall Street ended on November 15, when police forcibly evicted the occupiers.

FNB also participated in other Occupy actions. During Occupy Vancouver, FNB Vancouver served food out of a tent at the intersection of Georgia and Hornby streets, near the Vancouver Art Gallery, to both occupiers and the general public. During Occupy Miami, McHenry led an initiative called "Food Not Lawns", which saw FNB activists planting organic gardens in the grass around the occupation's tent cities. FNB also served food during Occupy D.C, Occupy Portland, Occupy Tampa, (Note: FNB activists gathered in Tampa to feed occupiers during the 2012 Republican National Convention.) and Occupy Seattle. After Hurricane Sandy in 2012, FNB activists in Long Island, New York, collaborated with Occupy activists to organize "Occupy Sandy", which distributed free clothing, food, and other items to hurricane victims. Some scholars note that global Occupy and Occupy-affiliated actions, such as Occupy Olomouc in the Czech Republic (Note: Anthropologist Mario Rodríguez Polo notes that in the aftermath of Occupy Olomouc, many of the occupiers joined FNB.) and the Gezi Park protests in Turkey (Note: In his master's thesis, sociologist Fahir Yumuk notes that multiple FNB chapters were founded in Istanbul between 2013 and 2017.) contributed to the growth of local FNB collectives.

=== Black Lives Matter movement ===
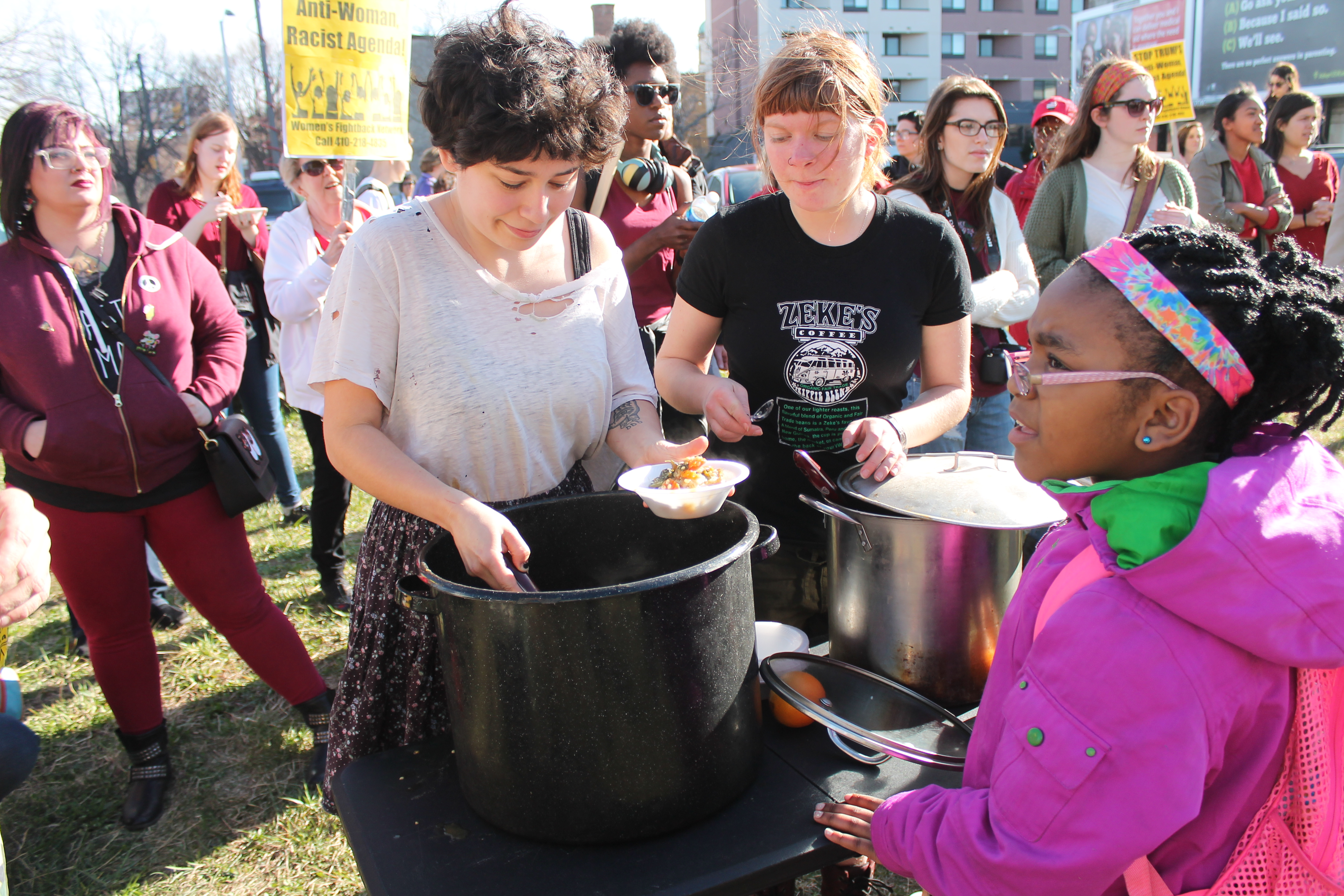
FNB serving food at a 2017 Day Without a Woman gathering in Baltimore, Maryland

In 2013, activists Alicia Garza, Ayọ Tometi, and Patrisse Cullors started the hashtag #BlackLivesMatter after the acquittal of George Zimmerman in the fatal shooting of Black teen Trayvon Martin. After the 2015 killing of Freddie Gray, a Black man from Baltimore, Maryland, FNB served food at a protest in front of City Hall.

On May 25, 2020, a Black man named George Floyd was killed by a police officer in Minneapolis, Minnesota. This sparked a series of protests associated with the Black Lives Matter movement in cities across the United States and Europe. In Wilmington, Delaware, FNB co-organized a march with the local Black Lives Matter chapter from Rodney Square to the Wilmington police headquarters. Over 1,000 people attended this protest. FNB also served food to Black Lives Matter protesters in Akron, Ohio's Highland Square and Burlington, Vermont's Battery Park In October 2024, it co-organized a march against police brutality in front of the county courthouse in Greenville, South Carolina, alongside several other activist organizations, including Upstate Black Lives Matter.

=== Fort Lauderdale sharing ban ===
In November 2014, Fort Lauderdale, Florida, enacted a food-sharing ban. FNB Fort Lauderdale had already come into conflict with police in August 2007, when police threatened to arrest FNB members during a foodshare at Stranahan Park. While FNB and its allies were able to convince the police to back down in 2007, police raided its headquarters in 2011, and in 2014, after the ban was passed, several FNB activists were arrested for sharing food and other acts of civil disobedience. Some FNB activists went on hunger strike to protest the ordinance. FNB also sued the city, arguing that its foodshares were protected under the First Amendment. In Fort Lauderdale Food Not Bombs v. City of Fort Lauderdale, a district court ruled that FNB's actions were not expressive enough to be protected. However, starting in February 2015, the city stopped enforcing the ordinance for several years.

Around 2018, the city began enforcing the ordinance again. That year, the United States Court of Appeals for the Eleventh Circuit heard the Fort Lauderdale Food Not Bombs v. City of Fort Lauderdale appeal. FNB argued that its First Amendment rights were violated because its foodshares were not charity but rather an attempt to communicate its anti-hunger and anti-poverty message. Meanwhile, the city argued that foodshares were not inherently communicative and that, even if they were, the ban was valid because it included reasonable time, place, and manner restrictions. The city also argued that there was "substantial and compelling" government interest in protecting the "peace, health, safety, and property of its citizens". In August, the court ruled that FNB's outdoor food sharing was sufficiently expressive and therefore protected under the First Amendment, causing the case to be remanded back to the district court.

While the district court initially ruled in favor of the city again, FNB appealed this decision as well, and the appeals court unanimously ruled that enforcing the law against FNB was unlawful in 2021. The ordinance was later repealed, and the city was required to repay FNB $640 thousand of the $1.5 million it had spent in legal fees. In response, City Commissioner John Herbst said that the city should have settled "a lot sooner" and that the conflict "went on far too long", acknowledging that the city had violated FNB's constitutional rights.

=== Houston ticketing controversy ===
Beginning in March 2023, the city of Houston, Texas, began regularly issuing tickets to the local FNB collective for violating a 2012 ordinance prohibiting distributing food to more than five people in any public space that is not a 70-by-40-foot parking lot. While FNB had originally been allowed to serve food in the plaza in front of the Houston Central Library by Mayor Annise Parker after 34,000 people signed a petition protesting the ordinance, the city began issuing the tickets because it argued that FNB's foodshares caused an increase in harassment.

One ticket issued to FNB volunteer Aliene Adams and seven tickets issued to volunteer Shere Dore were dismissed in August 2024 after local police failed to appear in court. In a separate federal case decided that same month, a jury found that FNB volunteer Phillip Picone did not violate any laws by participating in FNB foodshares at the library. By this time, the collective had received nearly 47 tickets. After these dismissals, city attorney Arturo G. Michel said that the city would continue to "vigorously pursue" ordinance violations. Meanwhile, in a Google Docs FAQ, FNB argued that the ordinance should be abolished beause, "people need to be allowed to go out with no advance notice or application process and find homeless people" to feed them where they are.

By late January 2024, FNB Houston had received almost 90 tickets. Two of these tickets were dismissed. In February 2024, a United States district court judge issued a preliminary injunction ordering the city to stop enforcing the ordinance after a lawsuit filed by the Texas Civil Rights Project, which argued that the city had violated the volunteers' First Amendment rights. By this time, the city had issued FNB volunteers 111 tickets seeking $25,000 in fines.

=== Gaza war protests ===
After the October 7 attacks against Israel and the subsequent Gaza war and genocide, FNB participated in several protests in solidarity with Palestine. These included a student demonstration in Athens, Ohio; a "Global Shutdown for Palestine" march in Boca Raton, Florida; and a "Call it Genocide" rally in downtown Dayton, Ohio. In April 2024, FNB provided food for a "Prayers Against Oppression" protest organized by Indigenous and Palestinian communities in Saskatoon, Canada. In May, FNB Lake Country provided food for the Gaza solidarity encampment that developed at Case Western Reserve University. FNB Steel City also provided food for a community potluck hosted by Jewish anti-Zionist group Jewish Voice for Peace in Pittsburgh, Pennsylvania, in June 2025.

== Ideology and beliefs ==
The Principles of Food Not Bombs

1. The food is always vegan or vegetarian and free to everyone without restriction, rich or poor, stoned or sober.
2. Food Not Bombs has no formal leaders or headquarters, and every group is autonomous and makes decisions using the consensus process
3. Food Not Bombs is dedicated to non-violent direct action and works for non-violent social change

— Food Not Bombs, quoted in Cooking Up a Revolution: Food Not Bombs, Homes Not Jails, and Resistance to Gentrification by Sean Parson

=== Veganism and vegetarianism ===
In its statement of principles, first outlined in 1992, FNB states that its food is always either vegan or vegetarian. In the book Hungry for Peace, an FNB primer released by the group, McHenry writes that FNB's adoption of veganism and vegetarianism was influenced by writer Frances Moore Lappe's 1971 book Diet for a Small Planet. In particular, FNB was influenced by Lappe's discussion of the environmental impact of meat production on land and water resources. McHenry argues that adopting vegan practices supports local small farms and thus the decentralization of agriculture, as well as reducing food spoilage and promoting a healthier diet.

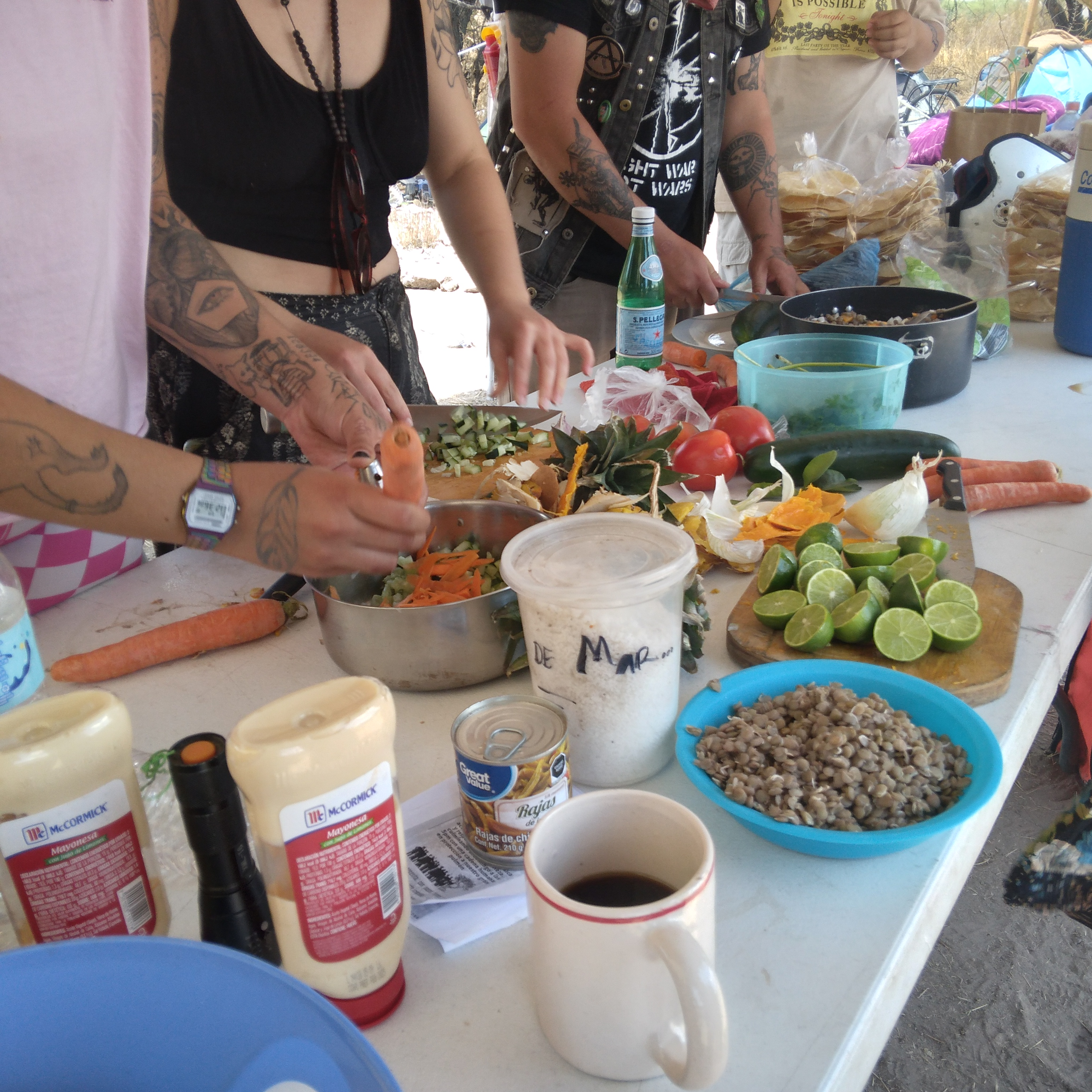
FNB members serving free meals in Aguascalientes, Mexico

Not all FNB collectives are fully vegan, however. For example, as of 2006, the Harrisonburg, Virginia, collective served food with dairy, eggs, and sometimes donated meat. Anarchist activist Peter Gelderloos, a member of the Harrisonburg collective, explains that many lower-class food recipients found FNB's vegan offerings unappetizing and unsatisfying. While some collective members opposed serving non-vegan food, Gelderloos argues that "vegan food is not culturally neutral, or even constitutive of a meal to people from some cultural backgrounds".

=== Free food for everyone ===
FNB says in its statement of principles that its food is free and available to anyone "without restriction, rich or poor, stoned or sober". In Hungry for Peace, McHenry argues that this is a way of responding both to poverty and to "lack of self-esteem", providing an alternative to bureaucratic systems that are "designed to control, humiliate and often punish people without money". According to Parson, FNB's free food distribution is influenced by the concept of mutual aid, which was first articulated by Russian anarchist Peter Kropotkin in 1890. Anthropologist Sarah Fessenden argues that FNB's free food distribution "de-commodifies" food "from the point of distribution to the moment of consumption".

=== Group autonomy and consensus ===
According to FNB's statement of principles, it is leaderless, with autonomous groups employing a consensus decision-making process. McHenry argues that FNB's lack of a formal leadership structure prevents authorities from targeting charismatic leaders to undermine the group. An FNB member interviewed by researcher and FNB volunteer David Boarder Giles recalls an incident when police approached the FNB Seattle collective in 2006:

The cop drives his car into the middle of the square — and, you know you don’t really see vehicles in there very often— and he pulls out this big megaphone, and was like, [cop voice] "One of you, come over here." And we all look at each other, and we’re like "No." And so eventually he keeps getting more and more upset... And so we said "No, we’re not — we don’t have a leader or anything." So we all went up and talked to him as a group... I think he was scared.

Former FNB activist Chris Crass notes that there have been debates within the group about the concept of leadership. Crass argues that figures like himself and McHenry often played leadership roles without acknowledging it, making it difficult to discuss the power dynamics at play within the group. According to Crass, recognizing this facilitated an ideological shift in the group from "no leaders" to "working to all be leaders".

Parson traces FNB's consensus decision-making process to the Quakers, who were influential in the anti-nuclear movement of the 1970s. Meanwhile, Boarder Giles states that it was "partly intended to emulate Indigenous political systems such as the Zapatistas and Iroquois". In the foreword to Hungry for Peace, historian Howard Zinn argues that FNB's consensus decision-making process provides an example of how to form a "good society". Boarder Giles argues that FNB's use of consensus is an "anarchist answer" to Robert's Rules of Order, an influential American book on parliamentary procedure.

==== Anarchism ====
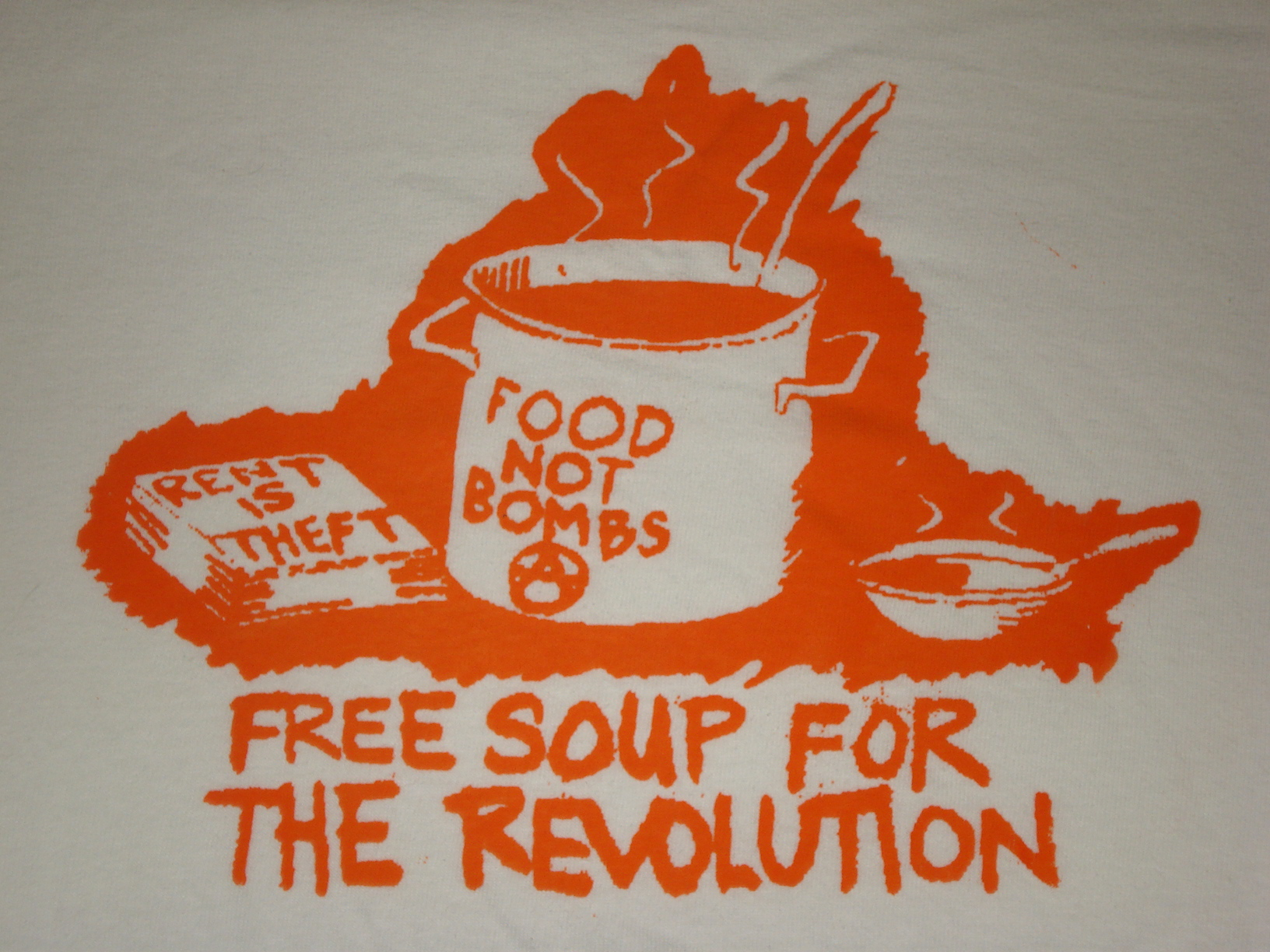
An FNB graphic featuring the circle-A, a common symbol of anarchism

Many (Note: See Heynen, Winter, Parson, Gracjasz & Grasseni, and Boarder Giles.) identify FNB as an anarchist group. Others, such as Fessenden, describe them as "anarchist-inspired". Parson argues that FNB was not originally an explicitly anarchist group, but that an association between FNB and anarchism emerged during the 1990s due to its association with the 1970s anti-nuclear movement, which Parson argues developed along anarchist principles. Meanwhile, researcher Drew Robert Winter states that all of FNB's founding members were anarchists but that they decided not to adopt an explicitly anarchist stance, believing that this would be "needlessly alienating". However, Winter also states that explicit anarchist affiliation is more important to FNB collectives in Indonesia and the Philippines, who commonly use anarchist symbols such as the circle-A.

In a study of one FNB collective by sociologist Deric Shannon, six out of 11 surveyed members explicitly identified as activists. The rest did not claim any specific political affiliation, but all said they support anarchist politics. One of these activists said that while they "like feminism, queer stuff, and anarchism too", that "the ideas are more important than the terms". Another activist explicitly identified as an anarchist but said that it was not "in any kind of narrow way" and that they "like things about all kinds of anti-authoritarian politics". Yet another identified as a "class struggle anarchist", stating that FNB "build[s] community and activity among working class people" and does political work instead of "just doing charity for people".

=== Nonviolence and direct action ===
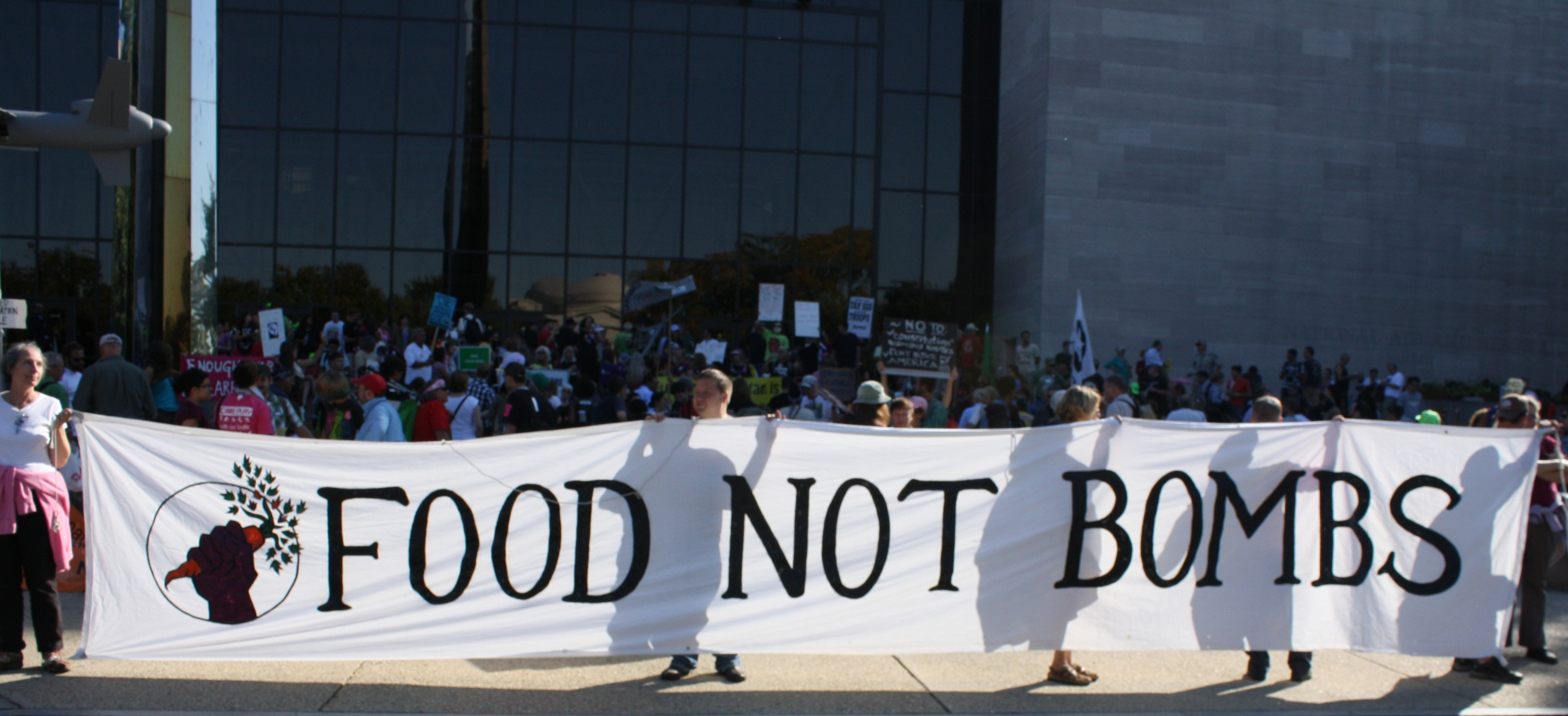
FNB protesters at a 2011 "Stop the Drones" protest in Washington, D.C.

FNB says in its statement of principles that it is dedicated to nonviolent direct action. In Hungry for Peace, McHenry argues that nonviolent action sustains change in a dignified way, drawing public support. However, he also says that nonviolence should not be confused with passivity, as he says that authorities will likely use violence to stamp out nonviolent movements. Boarder Giles argues that these "nonviolent clashes" have the power to "shape the terrain of urban space and enforcement" by creating a "many-headed hydra" (Note: The concept of the "many-headed hydra" comes from historians Marcus Rediker and Peter Linebaugh, who compare the transatlantic mass movements of the late 18th century to the mythical Lernaean Hydra, a many-headed beast in Greek mythology whose heads grew back as they were cut off.) capable of creating new opportunities for political affinity and resistance. Parson argues that by adopting nonviolence as an organizing principle, FNB contrasts itself with the "institutional and structural violence" of austerity and neoliberalism.

== Organizational structure ==
There are about 1,000 FNB collectives in about 60 countries. They exist on every continent except Antarctica. FNB collectives are autonomous and decentralized, taking part in a diverse array of activities. Membership is also diverse. Many FNB members are migrant workers, punks, underemployed or homeless people, or university students. As its members move between cities, they often found new collectives, facilitating the group's spread. Several scholars (Note: See Gavriluţă & Dăscăliţa and Hisham & Amin) identify FNB as a form of franchise activism (activism carried out by autonomous groups using the same name in different locations).

Many FNB collectives use similar procedures. First, they obtain food, either through donations or by gathering excess from local businesses, often by dumpster diving. They then cook this food and serve it, typically in public community spaces or at activist gatherings, such as book fairs, conferences, and protests. At these foodshares, FNB activists distribute literature and discuss global issues. FNB collectives are organized on a volunteer basis, with activists not receiving pay. They typically do not accept monetary donations beyond what is necessary to obtain basic supplies, such as pots, pans, and folding tables.

== Scholarly analysis and reception ==
Some scholars discuss the transgressive nature of FNB's activism. Researcher Nik Heynen argues that FNB is an example of nonviolent, democratic power based in civil disobedience and direct action. Meanwhile, researcher Amanda DiVito Wilson argues that FNB uses its foodshares to "[challenge] capitalism and unequal power relations". Researcher Dylan McMahon argues that the foodshares invoke the carnivalesque literary mode, (Note: The carnivalesque mode was first conceptualized by Russian literary scholar Mikhail Bakhtin, who defined it as a mode that uses popular humor to resist official hierarchies.) helping people to envision an alternative to everyday practices of consumerism and "gastronomical sanitation". Fessenden argues that FNB counters dominant exclusionary narratives about cities, with its foodshares creating "temporary autonomous zones" that "inscribe a liberatory ethic in the urban".

Other scholars discuss FNB's foodshares as a form of gift-giving. In studying the activities of an FNB collective in Gdańsk, Poland, researchers Aleksandra Gracjasz and Cristina Grasseni conclude that FNB's foodshares create networks of solidarity that defy the values of market exchange in favor of altruistic giving. Meanwhile, in a study of an FNB collective in Yangon, Myanmar, researcher Carolin Hirsch contrasts FNB's model with the Buddhist practice of dāna: religious gift-giving or, literally, "moral charity". She argues that while the dāna economy is a formalized part of Myanmar's hierarchical social welfare structure, FNB's foodshares explicitly reject hierarchies and attempt to form more even, symmetric relationships with the recipients of their aid.

== See also ==
- Bill Emerson Good Samaritan Act of 1996 – Act encouraging food donation to US nonprofits
- Curry Without Worry – Nepalese soup kitchen in San Francisco
- DIY ethic – Building, modifying, or repairing, without the aid of experts or professionals
- Freeganism – Stance of limited participation in the food system and broader economy in protest
- Give-away shop – Stores where all goods are free
- Langar (Sikhism) – Sikh community kitchen
- Langar (Sufism) – Charitable religious practice
- One World Cafe – Former cafe in Salt Lake City
- Rumford's Soup – Nutritional mixture
- SAME Cafe – Community cafe in Denver, Colorado, USA
- Volxkuche – Regularly occurring group cooking event

== Sources ==
- "10 years since Gothenburg riots". Sveriges Radio. 2011.
- "400 demonstrators arrested". The Daily Item. United Press International. 1985. p. 3 – via Newspapers.com.
- Adair, Stephen (2001). "The Origins of the Protest Movement Against Nuclear Power". In Coy, Patrick G. (ed.). Research in Social Movements, Conflicts and Change. Vol. 23. Bingley: Emerald. pp. 145–178. doi:10.1016/s0163-786x(01)80020-3. ISBN 978-0-7623-0786-9.
- Allad-iw, Arthur L. (2006). "'Sagada 11': Nightmare in Jail". Bulatlat.
- Armstrong, Matthew (1987). "Hans Haacke: Re-Presenting Reagan". Radical History Review. 1987 (38): 79–86. doi:10.1215/01636545-1987-38-79. ISSN 0163-6545.
- Bengwayan, A.T. (2006). "Free the Sagada 11: Int'l campaign kicks off for punks tortured by police in Buguias". Bulatlat.
- Benjamin, Terry II (2024). "Activists march in Greenville, demand prosecution of aggressive police". Greenville Online.
- Birch, Dinah; Hooper, Katy, eds. (2012). "Carnivalesque". The Concise Oxford Companion to English Literature. Oxford University Press.
- Boarder Giles, David (2021). A Mass Conspiracy to Feed People: Food Not Bombs and the World-Class Waste of Global Cities. Durham: Duke University Press. ISBN 978-1-4780-2171-1.
- Brutus, Wilkine (2023). "Pro-Palestinian groups clash with pro-Israel groups in Boca Raton". WLRN.
- Bryan, Susannah (2023). "Fort Lauderdale lost a homeless feeding ban case. Now the city owes $640,000 in attorneys' fees". South Florida Sun Sentinel.
- "Charges dropped against Orlando Food Not Bombs arrestees". Central Florida News. 2011. Archived from the original on February 22, 2012.
- Chew, Darcy; Treseler, Zachary; Nanda, Shivangi (2024). "Gaza solidarity encampment set up on KSL Oval". The Observer.
- Christián, László; Erdős, Ákos; Háló, Gergő (2022). "The Background and repercussions of the George Floyd case". Cogent Social Sciences. 8 (1) 2082094. doi:10.1080/23311886.2022.2082094. ISSN 2331-1886.
- Clary, Mike (2014). "Activist, 90, cited again for feeding Fort Lauderdale homeless". South Florida Sun Sentinel. Archived from the original on January 6, 2018.
- Conn, Jennifer (2020). "Akron Protesters March for Black Empowerment". Spectrum 1.
- Cook, Alex (August 22, 2012). "Food Not Bombs to Feed Protesters During RNC". WUSF.
- Crass, Chris (2009). "But We Don't Have Leaders: Leadership Development and Anti-Authoritarian Organizing". The Anarchist Library.
- Dada, Yinka (2006). "Food Not Bombs & NANS 2006 Nigerian Tour: Our Acceptance". Food Not Bombs.
- Dada, Yinka O.; Israel, Idowu O. (2006). "West African Food Not Bombs Organising Collective Report: FNB/NANS Nigerian Tour February 2006". Food Not Bombs.
- DiVito Wilson, Amanda (2013). "Beyond Alternative: Exploring the Potential for Autonomous Food Spaces". Antipode. 45 (3): 719–737. doi:10.1111/j.1467-8330.2012.01020.x. ISSN 0066-4812.
- Donohoe, Kevin S. (2011). "Food Not Bombs Members Arrested for Feeding the Hungry". The Nation.
- Downey, Gary L. (1986). "Ideology and the Clamshell Identity: Organizational Dilemmas in the Anti-Nuclear Power Movement". Social Problems. 33 (5): 357–373. doi:10.2307/800656. hdl:10919/25820. JSTOR 800656.
- Dumlao, Artemio (2006). "3 punks cleared of any links with communists". Philstar.
- Dupuis-Déri, Francis (2010). "Anarchism and the Politics of Affinity Groups". Anarchist Studies. 18 (1): 40–61. ISSN 0967-3393.
- Eckerson, Amanda (2011). "First the Dishes, then the Revolution". Portland Monthly.
- Emerson, William J. III (2010). "Battle of Seattle". Culture Wars: An Encyclopedia of Issues, Viewpoints, and Voices. Armonk: M.E. Sharpe. pp. 37–38. ISBN 978-0-7656-2250-1.
- "Federal Appeals Court Sides with Orlando on Homeless Feeding Ban". Lakeland Ledger. Associated Press. 2010.
- Fessenden, Sarah Grace (2017). "We just wanna warm some bellies": Food Not Bombs, anarchism, and recycling wasted food for protest (Doctoral thesis). Vancouver: University of British Columbia.
- Fessenden, Sarah (2021). "Food Is a Right Not a Privilege: Punk Anarchism, Ephemerality, and Seeding Change in Vancouver". In Kuppinger, Petra (ed.). Emergent Spaces: Change and Innovation in Small Urban Spaces. Cham: Springer Nature. ISBN 978-3-030-84379-3.
- "Food Not Bombs in Nigeria". Food Not Bombs. 2006.
- Fornarola, Isaac; Syed, Maleeha (2020). "Battery Park Burlington VT protest: A day in the life of protesters". Burlington Free Press.
- "Free the Sagada 11 Solidarity". Food Not Bombs. 2006.
- "Ft. Lauderdale hunger striker continues to protest city's ban on sharing food in parks". WMNF. 2013. Archived from the original on January 5, 2015.
- Gavriluţă, Cristina; Dăscăliţa, Ana-Dăscăliţa (2011). "The Social Activism and its Manifestations". Analele Ştiinţifice ale Universităţii »Alexandru Ioan Cuza« din Iaşi. Sociologie şi Asistenţă Socială. 1: 67–80.
- Gay, Kathlyn; Gay, Martin (1999). "Direct Action". Encyclopedia of Political Anarchy. Santa Barbara: ABC-CLIO. p. 62-63. ISBN 978-0-87436-982-3.
- Gelderloos, Peter (2006). "A Critical History of Harrisonburg Food Not Bombs". Social Anarchism. 39 – via The Anarchist Library.
- Goggin, Kayla (2021). "11th Circuit finds Fort Lauderdale limits on food sharing in parks unconstitutional". Courthouse News Service.
- Gordon, Bill (1988). "Volunteers Arrested at S.F. Food Giveaway". San Francisco Chronicle. p. 3 – via Newspapers.com.
- Gordon, Rachel (1995). "Jordan struck a chord, but few liked the tune". The San Francisco Examiner. p. 12 – via Newspapers.com.
- Gore, Jeff (2011). "Orlando's ban on feeding the homeless goes to court". Orlando Weekly.
- Gracjasz, Aleksandra; Grasseni, Cristina (2020). "Food-gifting in Gdańsk. Between Food Not Bombs and the Food Bank". Ethnologia Polona. 41. doi:10.23858/ethp.2020.41.2018. ISSN 2719-6976.
- Green, Matthew (2019). "TIMELINE: The Frustrating Political History of Homelessness in San Francisco". KQED.
- Gregory, James N. (2020). "Remapping the American Left". Labor. 17 (2): 11–45. doi:10.1215/15476715-8114733. ISSN 1547-6715.
- Grunau, Sarah (2024). "U.S. District Court judge orders Houston to stop ticketing Food Not Bombs for feeding homeless". Houston Public Media. Archived from the original on September 18, 2025.
- Gunningham, Neil (2017). "Building Norms from the Grassroots Up: Divestment, Expressive Politics, and Climate Change". Law & Policy. 39 (4): 372–392. doi:10.1111/lapo.12083. ISSN 0265-8240.
- Hammond, John L. (2015). "The Anarchism of Occupy Wall Street". Science & Society. 79 (2): 288–313. doi:10.1521/siso.2015.79.2.288. ISSN 0036-8237. JSTOR 24583903.
- Hirsch, Carolin (2024). Mutual Support Networks: Myanmar Food Not Bombs as a Solidarity Economy. 4th International Conference on Burma/Myanmar Studies. Chiang Mai: Chiang Mai University.
- "Hey Dyer, Who You Callin' a Terrorist?". West Orlando News. 2011. Archived from the original on February 6, 2012.
- Heynen, Nik (2010). "Cooking up Non-violent Civil-disobedient Direct Action for the Hungry: 'Food Not Bombs' and the Resurgence of Radical Democracy in the US". Urban Studies. 47 (6): 1225–1240. doi:10.1177/0042098009360223. ISSN 0042-0980.
- Heynen, Nik (2015). "Bringing the Body Back to Life through Radical Geography of Hunger: The Haymarket Affair and its Aftermath". ACME. 7 (1): 32–44 Pages. doi:10.14288/ACME.V7I1.792.
- Hisham, Nadiyah Noor; Amin, Noor Dina Md (2023). "Designing for Homeless in Kuala Lumpur: Concepts and Case Studies". International Journal of Integrated Engineering. 15 (6). doi:10.30880/ijie.2023.15.06.029.
- Holmes, Marisa (2023). Organizing Occupy Wall Street: This is Just Practice. Singapore: Springer Nature. ISBN 978-981-19-8947-6.
- Holpuch, Amanda (2023). "Houston Volunteers Fight Tickets for Serving Meals to Homeless People". The New York Times.
- Hudson, David L Jr. (2018). "11th Circuit rules Fort Lauderdale group feeding homeless is expressive enough for First Amendment protection". The Free Speech Center.
- Huff, Ryan (2007). "Protest's tragic turn remembered". East Bay Times.
- Hughes, Isabel (2020). "'Not just a black thing anymore' Wilmington protesters say, demanding justice for George Floyd". Delaware Online.
- "Israel has committed genocide in the Gaza Strip, UN Commission finds". OHCHR. September 16, 2025. Archived from the original on September 25, 2025.
- Jenkins, Mark (June 16, 2011). "Attorney: Homeless feeding arrests are unlawful". Central Florida News. Archived from the original on August 27, 2011.
- Johnson, Clarence (1995). "Tougher Moves Against the Homeless". San Francisco Chronicle. p. 4 – via Newspapers.com.
- Joseph, Chris (2014). "Eight Protesters Arrested for Trying to Meet With City Officials Over Homeless Laws; One Is Hunger-Striking". Broward Palm Beach New Times. Archived from the original on January 5, 2015.
- Kauffman, L.A. (2002). "A Short History of Radical Renewal". In Shepard, Benjamin; Hayduk, Ronald (eds.). From ACT UP to the WTO: Urban Protest and Community Building in the Era of Globalization. London: Verso. pp. 35–40. ISBN 1-85984-653-X.
- Kimmett, Colleen (November 10, 2011). "Occupy Vancouver Becomes Big Downtown Eatery". The Tyee.
- Kington, Dani (2023). "Demonstration shows support for Palestine – Athens County Independent". Athens County Independent.
- Kinna, Ruth (1995). "Kropotkin's Theory of Mutual Aid in Historical Context". International Review of Social History. 40 (2): 259–283. doi:10.1017/S0020859000113227. ISSN 0020-8590.
- Lane, Kimberly; Williams, Yaschica; Hunt, Andrea N.; Paulk, Amber (2020). "The Framing of Race: Trayvon Martin and the Black Lives Matter Movement". Journal of Black Studies. 51 (8): 790–812. doi:10.1177/0021934720946802. ISSN 0021-9347.
- Lehman, Betsy (1982). "Anti-Reagan tents on Common". The Boston Globe. p. 31 – via Newspapers.com.
- Levy, Peter B. (2013). "New Left". In Rubin, Joan Shelley; Casper, Scott E. (eds.). The Oxford Encyclopedia of American Cultural and Intellectual History. Oxford: Oxford University Press.
- Linebaugh, Peter; Rediker, Marcus (1990). "The Many-Headed Hydra: Sailors, Slaves, and the Atlantic Working Class in the Eighteenth Century". Journal of Historical Sociology. 3 (3): 225–252. doi:10.1111/j.1467-6443.1990.tb00149.x. ISSN 0952-1909.
- Linn, John (2007). "954 Represent!". Broward Palm Beach New Times. Archived from the original on February 18, 2017.
- Maar, Henry Richard III (2021). Freeze!: The Grassroots Movement to Halt the Arms Race and End the Cold War. Ithaca: Cornell University Press. ISBN 978-1-5017-6089-1.
- McHenry, Keith (2012). Hungry for Peace: How You Can Help End Poverty and War with Food Not Bombs (PDF). Tucson: See Sharp Press. ISBN 978-1-937276-06-5.
- McMahon, Dylan (2017). "A 'Feast of Fools': Food Security and the Carnivalesque in Peterborough, Ontario's Food Not Bombs". UnderCurrents: Journal of Critical Environmental Studies. 20: 18–31. doi:10.25071/2292-4736/39893. ISSN 2292-4736.
- "NANS Senate Resolution 2006". National Association of Nigerian Students. 2006 – via Food Not Bombs.
- Parson, Sean (2015). "Parks, Permits, and Riot Police: San Francisco Food Not Bombs and Autonomous Occupations of Space". New Political Science. 37 (3): 346–362. doi:10.1080/07393148.2015.1056430. ISSN 0739-3148.
- Parson, Sean (2018). Cooking Up a Revolution: Food Not Bombs, Homes Not Jails, and Resistance to Gentrification. Manchester: Manchester University Press. ISBN 978-1-5261-0735-0.
- Peck, John E. (2020). "The Prefiguration of Seattle: A Battle Many Years in the Making". Socialism and Democracy. 34 (1): 66–85. doi:10.1080/08854300.2020.1763067. ISSN 0885-4300.
- Perez, Andrew (2014). "More homeless-feeding arrests in Ft. Lauderdale amid national backlash". Local 10. Archived from the original on January 5, 2015.
- "Philippines: Eleven persons, among which are two children, arbitrarily detained". World Organisation Against Torture. 2006.
- Picon, Andres (2022). "He hacked into government computers to 'peacefully' protest treatment of homeless people. How should he be punished?". San Francisco Chronicle.
- Rampino, Jacob (2024). "'Not Another Bomb' protests pressure Harris to end Israel arms supply". FSView & Florida Flambeau.
- Rishaug, Noah (2024). "Saskatoon Indigenous and Palestinian communities gather in collective prayer for Gaza". CTV.
- Rodríguez Polo, Mario (2014). "A comparative approach to Occupy Olomouc through the 15M-Movement experience". In Sobolewska-Myślik, Katarzyna; Kasprowicz, Dominika (eds.). Space: Socio-Political Alternatives in Central Europe. Warsaw: Dom Wydawniczy Elipsa. ISBN 978-83-8017-020-9.
- Rogers, Alisdair; Castree, Noel; Kitchin, Rob, eds. (2013). "Anti-globalization movement". A Dictionary of Human Geography. Oxford University Press.
- Rosenblum, Sydney (2019). "Homeless and Hungry: Demanding the Right to Share Food". Fordham Urban Law Journal. 46 (4): 1004–1040.
- Santich, Kate (2007). "Man not guilty in homeless feeding case". Orlando Sentinel. Archived from the original on October 12, 2007.
- Schlueb, Mark (2010). "Homeless advocates win new hearing in Lake Eola park-feeding case". Orlando Sentinel. Archived from the original on September 11, 2010.
- Schuetz, R.A. (2025). "Inside Houston's quiet shift to police the homeless". Houston Chronicle.
- Shakarian, Paulo; Shakarian, Jana; Ruef, Andrew (2013). Introduction to Cyber-Warfare: A Multidisciplinary Approach. Amsterdam; Boston: Syngress Press. ISBN 978-0-12-407814-7.
- Shannon, Deric (2016). "Food Justice, Direct Action, and the Human Rights Enterprise". Critical Sociology. 42 (6): 799–814. doi:10.1177/0896920515608924. ISSN 0896-9205.
- Sheedy, Matt (2014). "The Occupy Movement, Religion and Social Formations". Bulletin for the Study of Religion. 43 (1): 17–24. doi:10.1558/bsor.v43i1.17. ISSN 2041-1871.
- Siegel, Jonathan R. (2020). "A Law Professor's Guide to Parliamentary Procedure". Journal of Legal Education. 70: 26–64. ISSN 0022-2208.
- Solnit, Rebecca; Schwartzenberg, Susan (2000). Hollow City: The Siege of San Francisco and the Crisis of American Urbanism. London; New York: Verso. ISBN 1-85984-794-3.
- Spataro, David (2015). "Against a de-politicized DIY urbanism: Food Not Bombs and the struggle over public space". Journal of Urbanism. 9 (2): 185–201. doi:10.1080/17549175.2015.1056208. ISSN 1754-9175.
- Stolberg, Sheryl Gay (2015). "After Thousands Rally in Baltimore, Police Make Some Arrests as Curfew Takes Hold". The New York Times.
- Talbot, Stephen (2016). "'To Have and Have Not': The Early Days of Bay Area Homelessness". KQED.
- Thomas, Dominique; Zuckerman, Allana (2018), "Black Lives Matter in Community Psychology", Community Psychology in Global Perspective, vol. 4, no. 2, University of Salento, pp. 1–8, doi:10.1285/I24212113V4I2P1
- Thornton, Claire (August 3, 2023). "Texas man who gave food to homeless outside Houston library files suit". USA TODAY.
- Turner, Matt (2011). "Clamshell Alliance campaigns against Seabrook Nuclear Power Plant, New Hampshire, 1976-1989". Global Nonviolent Action Database.
- van Voorst, L. Bruce (1982). "The Critical Masses". Foreign Policy (48): 82–93. doi:10.2307/1148267. JSTOR 1148267.
- Vasquez, Lucio (2024). "Two more cases were dismissed against Food Not Bombs for feeding city's unhoused community". Houston Public Media. Archived from the original on August 2, 2025.
- Waldron, Jeremy (2000). "Homelessness and Community". University of Toronto Law Journal. 50 (4): 371–406. ISSN 0381-1638.
- Walker, Thaai (1995). "Nearly 300 Arrested in Fiery S.F. Protest". San Francisco Chronicle. p. 10 – via Newspapers.com.
- Weiss, Marshall (2025). "Local Jewish grad student among speakers at 'Call it Genocide' rally downtown". The Dayton Jewish Observer.
- Wilkinson, Rachel (2025). "JVP and others host potlucks to 'spotlight hunger from Pittsburgh to Palestine'". Pittsburgh City Paper.
- Winter, Drew Robert (2015). "Doing Liberation: The Story and Strategy of Food Not Bombs". In Nocella, Anthony J. II; White, Richard J.; Cudworth, Erika (eds.). Anarchism and Animal Liberation: Essays on Complementary Elements of Total Liberation. Jefferson: McFarland. ISBN 978-1-4766-2132-6.
- Yumuk, Fahir (2022). Between Anxiety and Hope: The Ebb and Flow of Prefigurative Politics After Gezi Protests (Master's thesis). Istanbul: Boğaziçi University.
- Zinn, Howard (2006). "Remembering Food Not Bombs volunteer Eric Weinberger, February 19, 1932 - December 15, 2006". Food Not Bombs.
- Zinn, Howard (2012). Foreword. Hungry for Peace: How You Can Help End Poverty and War with Food Not Bombs (PDF). By McHenry, Keith. Tucson: See Sharp Press. p. 7. ISBN 978-1-937276-06-5.
