= Chris Day (disambiguation) =

Chris Day (born 1975) is an English footballer.

Chris or Christopher Day may also refer to:

- Chris Day (hepatologist) (born 1960), Vice-Chancellor of Newcastle University
- Chris Day (basketball), basketball coach
- Chris Crass, birth name of American anarchist activist

== See also ==
- Christian Day (born 1983), rugby union player
