= Soup kitchen =

Place where food is available at no cost as charity

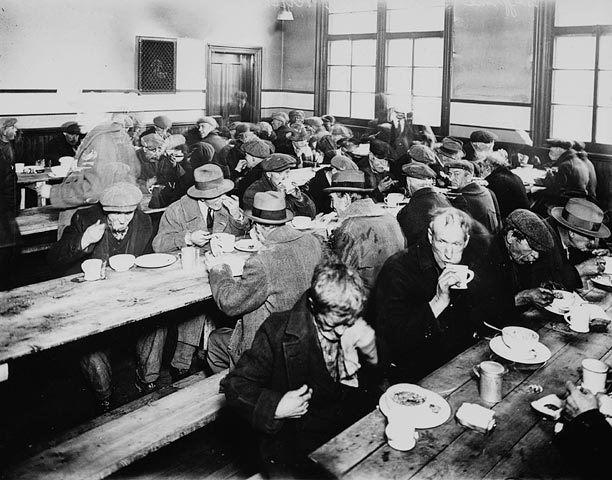
A soup kitchen, Montreal, Quebec, Canada, 1931

A soup kitchen, food kitchen, or meal center is a place where food is offered to homeless or needy people, usually at no cost, or token payment. Frequently located in lower-income neighborhoods, soup kitchens are usually staffed by volunteer organizations, such as church or community groups. Soup kitchens sometimes obtain food from a food bank for free, or at a low price, because they are considered a charity.

The first soup kitchens opened in the 18th century. By the late 19th century, they could be found in many American and European cities. They became more widespread in the 20th century, especially during the Great Depression. As economic conditions improved after World War II, soup kitchens became less common.

In the 21st century, the number of soup kitchens has increased in both the United States and Europe, following lasting global increases in the price of food which began in late 2006. Demand grew as the Great Recession and the economic and inflation crisis of the 2020s affected earning power. In much of the UK and Europe, demand further increased after the introduction of austerity-based economic policies from 2010. According to Emma Middleton, a poverty caseworker in the UK, in 2017 the situation and need for emergency food aid in the UK had changed significantly over the previous 15 years, as the cost of living increased and the existing safety nets had disappeared, adding that "In the first few years [of this work], food poverty was not an issue. The soup kitchens and churches could deal with it, and it was mainly homelessness. You never saw families like that. What we see now is a constant stream of food poverty."

== History ==
The earliest occurrences of soup kitchens are difficult to identify. Throughout history, societies have invariably recognized a moral obligation to feed hungry people. The philosopher Simone Weil wrote that feeding the hungry when one has resources to do so is the most obvious obligation of all. She also said that as far back as Ancient Egypt, it was believed that people needed to show they had helped the hungry in order to justify themselves in the afterlife. Soup has long been one of the most economical and simple ways to supply nutritious food to large numbers of people.

In the Ayyubid dynasty, soup kitchens called "Takiyyas" emerged, besides providing food to the poor, they also served as shelters, and often served religious purposes. One of the earliest known such soup kitchens is the Abrahamic hospice in the Old City of Hebron, established in 1279CE by Sultan Qalawun, it continues to operate to this day.

The Christian church had been providing food to hungry people since St Paul's day, and since at least the early Middle Ages such nourishment was sometimes provided in the form of soup. From the 14th to the 19th centuries, Islamic soup kitchens, called Imarets, were built throughout the Ottoman Empire. Soup and bread were often the main food served, though sometimes also rice, meat, fruit and sweet puddings.

Social historian Karl Polanyi wrote that before markets became the world's dominant form of economic organisation in the 19th century, most human societies would generally either starve all together or not at all; because communities would naturally share their food. As markets began to replace the older forms of resource allocation such as redistribution, reciprocity, and autarky, society's overall level of food security would typically rise. But food insecurity could become worse for the poorest section of society, and the need arose for more formal methods for providing them with food.

=== Emergence of the modern soup kitchen ===
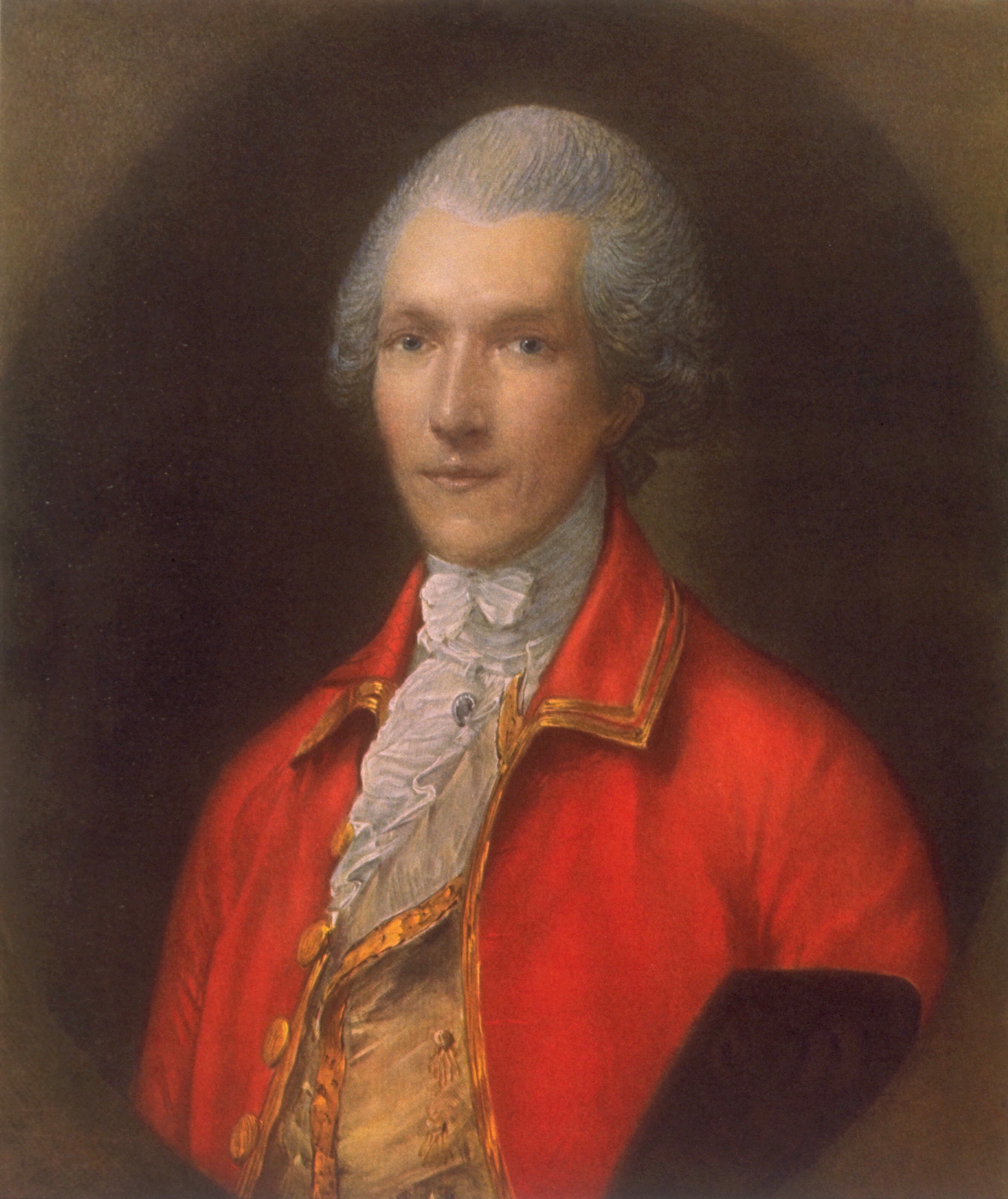
Count Rumford, painted by Thomas Gainsborough, 1783

The earliest modern soup kitchens were established by the inventor Sir Benjamin Thompson, who was employed as an aide-de-camp to the Elector of Bavaria in the 1790s. Thompson was an American loyalist refugee from New England and an inventor who was ennobled by Bavaria as Count Rumford. The Count was a prominent advocate of hunger relief, writing pamphlets that were widely read across Europe.

Count Rumford's message was especially well received in Great Britain, where he had previously held a senior government position for several years and was known as "the Colonel". An urgent need had recently arisen in Britain for hunger relief, due to her leading role in driving the Industrial Revolution. While technological development and economic reforms were rapidly increasing overall prosperity, conditions for the poorest were often made worse, as traditional ways of life were disrupted. In the closing years of the 18th century, soup kitchens run on the principles pioneered by Rumford were to be found throughout England, Wales, and Scotland, with about 60,000 people being fed by them daily in London alone.

While soup kitchens were initially well regarded, they attracted criticism from some, for encouraging dependency, and sometimes on a local level for attracting vagrants to an area. In Britain, they were made illegal, along with other forms of aid apart from workhouses, by the Poor Law Amendment Act 1834. (Note: Note that criticism of soup kitchens was only a minor driver of the 1834 law - the move was driven more by free market ideology and discontent with other forms of "outdoor" aid like the much more widely disliked Speemhanland system, see Hunger in the United Kingdom.)

During the Irish famine of the 19th century, in which one million people may have died, the British government passed the Temporary Relief Act (also known as the Soup Kitchen Act) in February 1847. The Act amended the restrictions on the provision of aid outside the workhouses for the duration of the famine and expressly allowed the establishment of soup kitchens in Ireland to relieve pressure from the overstretched Poor Law system, which was proving to be totally inadequate in coping with the disaster.

Prohibition against soup kitchens was soon relaxed on mainland Britain too, though they never again became as prevalent as they had been in the early 19th century, partly as from the 1850s onwards, economic conditions generally began to improve even for the poorest. For the first few decades after the return of soup kitchens to mainland Britain, they were at first heavily regulated, run by groups like the Charity Organization Society. Even in the early 20th century, campaigning journalists like Bart Kennedy would criticize them for their long queues, and for the degrading questions staff would ask hungry people before giving out any soup.

=== The United States ===
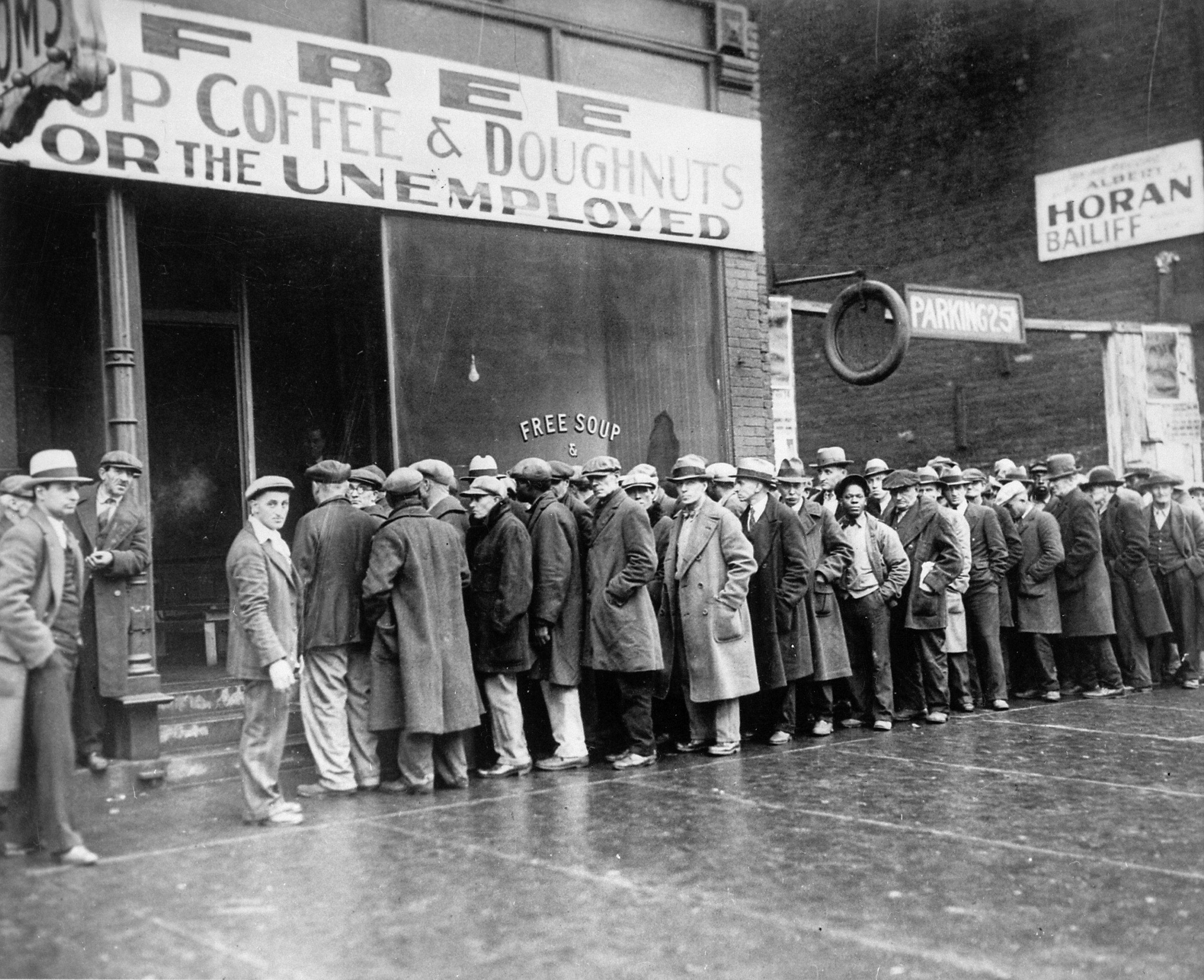
Unemployed men outside a soup kitchen opened by Al Capone in Depression-era Chicago, Illinois, the US, 1931

The early history of soup kitchens in the United States, originally called soup houses, can be seen in the case example of Baltimore, Maryland. The city's first documented large-scale effort occurred during the harsh winter of 1804-1805, when Mayor Thorogood Smith and a citizens' committee established a facility near the Centre Market that served up to a thousand quarts of soup daily using a ticket system. This model was formalized during the difficult panic of 1819 with the creation of the Baltimore Economical Soup Society. To preserve the dignity of the needy, the society also opened a "pay soup-house" in 1820, allowing those reluctant to accept charity to purchase food at a low cost. The practice was revived on a much larger scale during the Civil War, when high food prices created widespread need. This era was marked by individual philanthropy, exemplified by Celeste Revillon Winans (wife of Thomas Winans the railroad engineer), who in 1861 converted a former church into a huge soup house. By the 1870s, these individual efforts had evolved into multiple soup houses that operated simultaneously, run by diverse civic and religious groups like the Ladies' Relief Association, the German Ladies' Relief Association, and the Lafayette soup-house, supported by prominent citizens.

The term "breadline" entered the popular lexicon in the 1880s, when a bakery in New York City instituted a policy of distributing unsold baked goods to the poor, who would line up at the end of the day. In the decades following the 1870s, the ad-hoc system of food relief, such as the "breadline", came to be seen by a new generation of reformers as inefficient and a potential encouragement of dependency. This led to the rise of the Scientific Charity Movement, which aimed to organize and centralize relief efforts. Chapters of the Charity Organization Society (COS) were created in the US during the late 1870s and 1880s. The COS did not dispense relief itself, but acted as a clearinghouse, investigating individual cases of need to determine the "deserving poor" and coordinating the work of the city's disparate charitable groups to avoid duplication of effort and promote self-sufficiency over simple handouts.

The new, organized approach to charity was put to a severe test during the nationwide economic depression known as the Panic of 1893. There was widespread unemployment overwhelming the capacity of the COS and other established charities. Emergency soup kitchens were established by various citizens' committees and benevolent societies, drawing massive lines of thousands of unemployed men and their families.

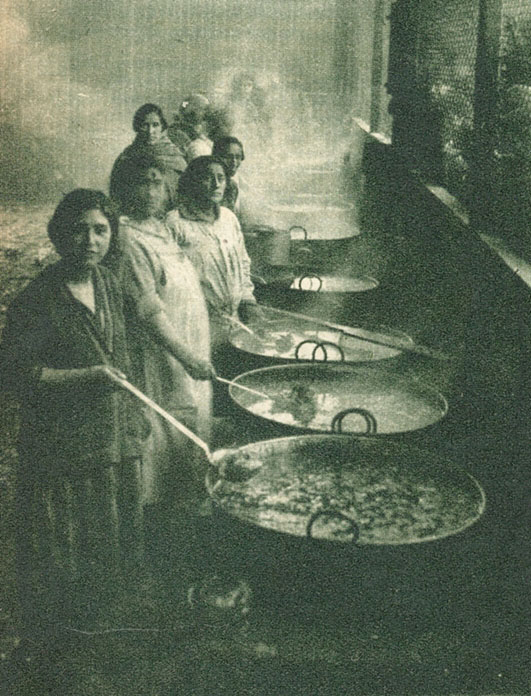
Chilean women preparing soup kitchen meals in 1932

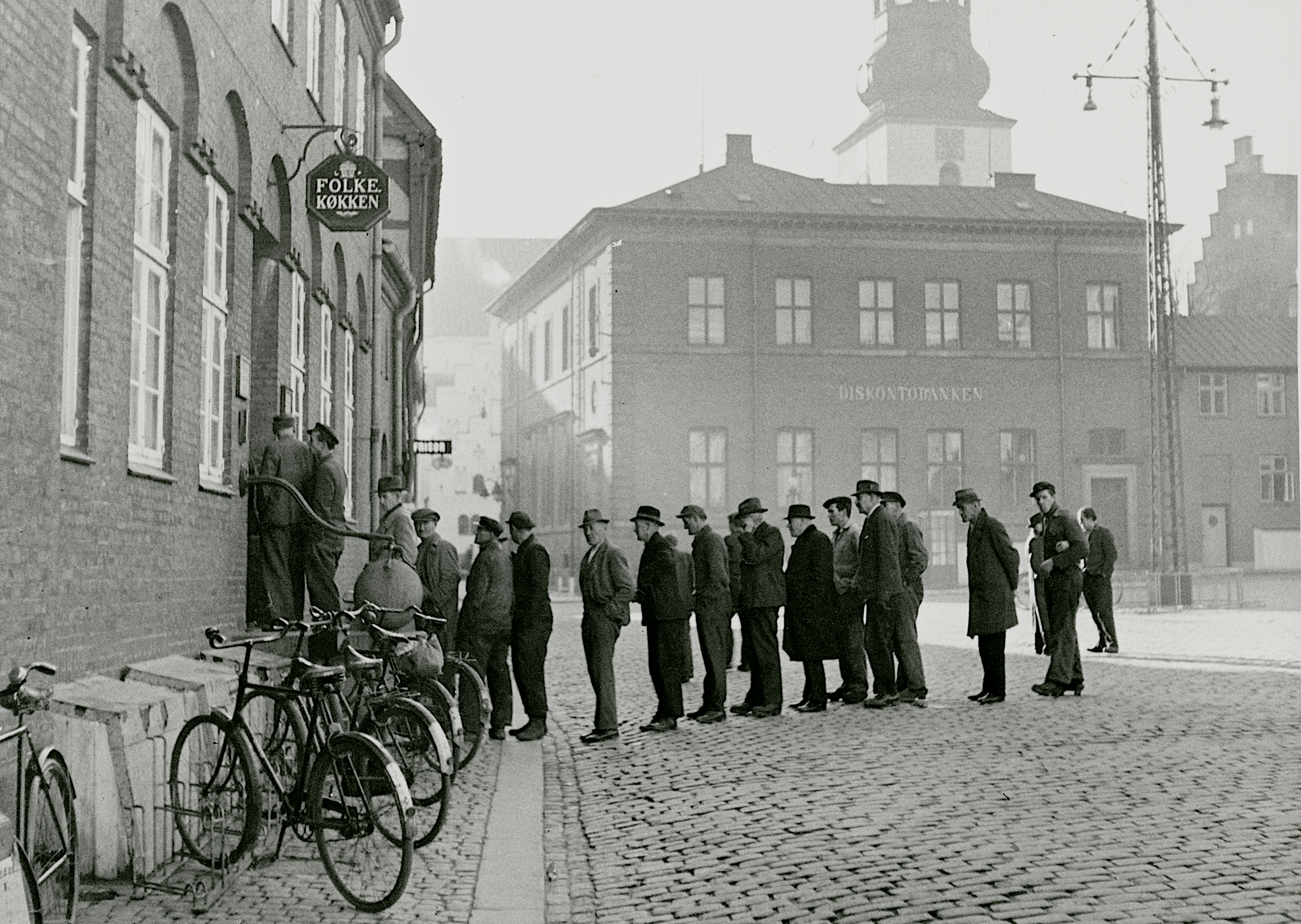
Soup kitchen queue in Aarhus, Occupied Denmark, 1943

Soup kitchens were an iconic image of the early Great Depression particularly in the early days when emergency privately funded soup kitchens were set up. One soup kitchen in Chicago was sponsored by American mobster Al Capone in an apparent effort to clean up his image. This began to change with President Franklin D. Roosevelt's New Deal in 1933. Federal programs, particularly the Federal Emergency Relief Administration (FERA) and the Civil Works Administration (CWA), funneled millions of dollars for direct cash relief and work-relief jobs. This strategy fundamentally shifted the social safety net from private, direct-food charity to government-funded employment and assistance. As thousands began receiving a federal paycheck or a relief check, the massive emergency soup kitchens of the early Depression were gradually diminished, superseded by a new national system of support.

With the improved economic conditions that followed the Second World War, and federal food relief programs, there was less need for soup kitchens in advanced economies. However, with the scaling back of welfare provision in the 1980s under President Ronald Reagan's administration, there was a rapid rise in activity from grass roots hunger relief agencies such as soup kitchens. According to a comprehensive government survey completed in 2002, over 90% of food banks, about 80% of emergency kitchens, and all known food rescue organisations, were established in the US after Reagan took office in 1981. Presently, Catholic Charities USA of Colorado Springs, Colorado, founded by The Sisters of Loretto, provides food to 600–700 persons or more per day, and has been doing so since 1985.

== In the 21st century ==
Use of soup kitchens has grown rapidly across the world, following the lasting global inflation in the cost of food that began in late 2006. The 2008 financial crisis further increased the demand for soup kitchens, as did the introduction of austerity policies that have become common in Europe since 2010. Modern soup kitchens are generally well regarded, though like their historical counterparts they are sometimes disliked by local residents for lowering the tone of a neighborhood.

=== Sikh temple soup kitchens ===
Every Sikh Gurdwara has a religiously sanctioned moral and humanitarian obligation to serve and provide hospitality, provisions, nourishments and meals to any person, regardless of race, creed, gender, caste, religious profession, identification, or affiliation. At the Langar (the Gurdwara's community run free kitchen), food is served to all visitors regardless of faith, religion, or background. Only lacto-vegetarian food is served and people eat together as equals. The institution of the Sikh langar was started by the first Sikh Guru, Guru Nanak. It was designed to uphold the principle of equality between all people regardless of religion, caste, colour, creed, age, gender, or social status. In addition to the ideals of equality, the tradition of langar expresses the ethics of sharing, community, inclusiveness, and oneness of humankind.

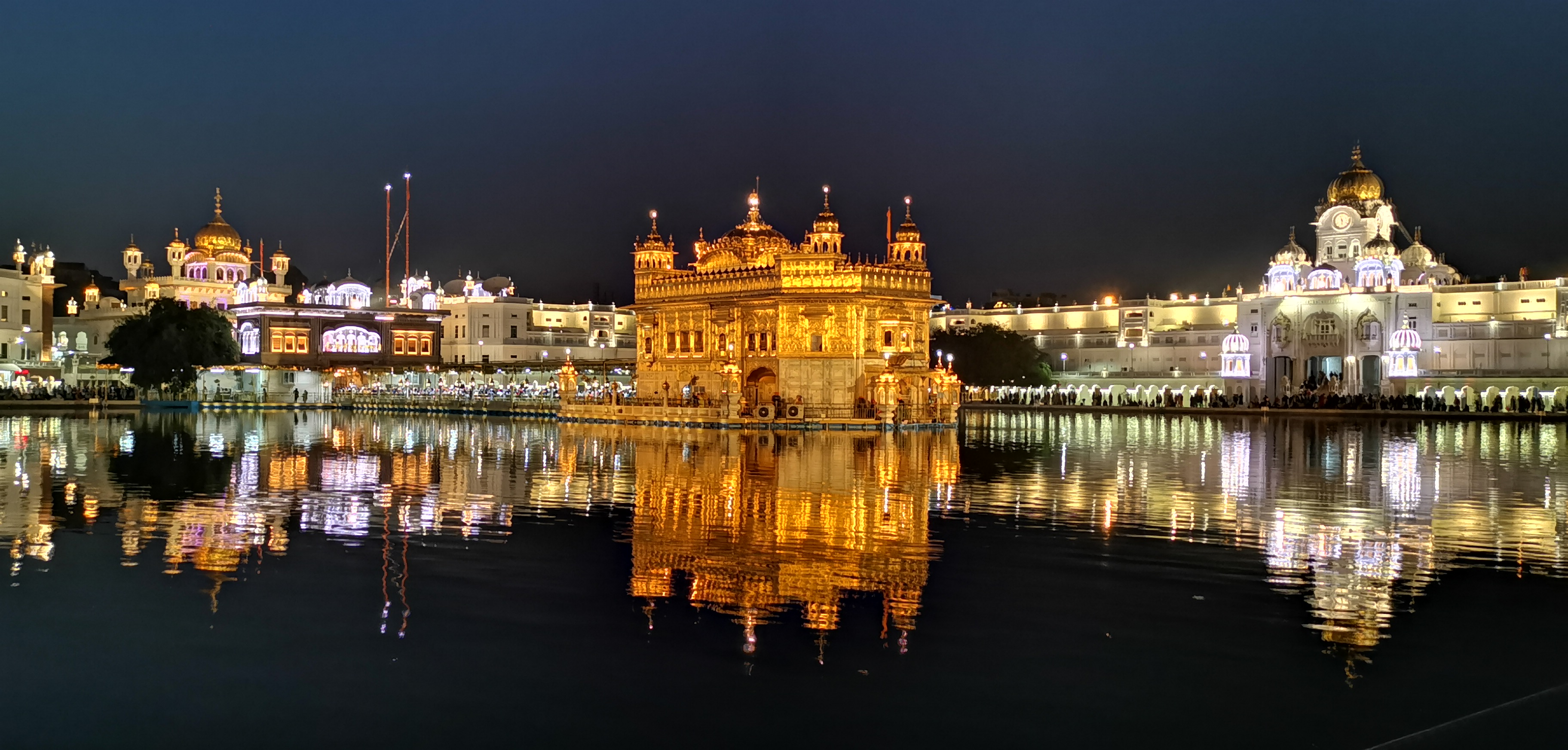
The Harmandir Sahib at night

The world's largest and longest running soup kitchen is run at the Sikhs' holiest shrine, Harmandir Sahib in Punjab, India, which in 2013 was serving free food for up to 300,000 people every day. It was started in circa 1481 AD by Guru Nanak and has continued ever since, except for two brief breaks.

=== Comparison with front line food banks and pantries ===
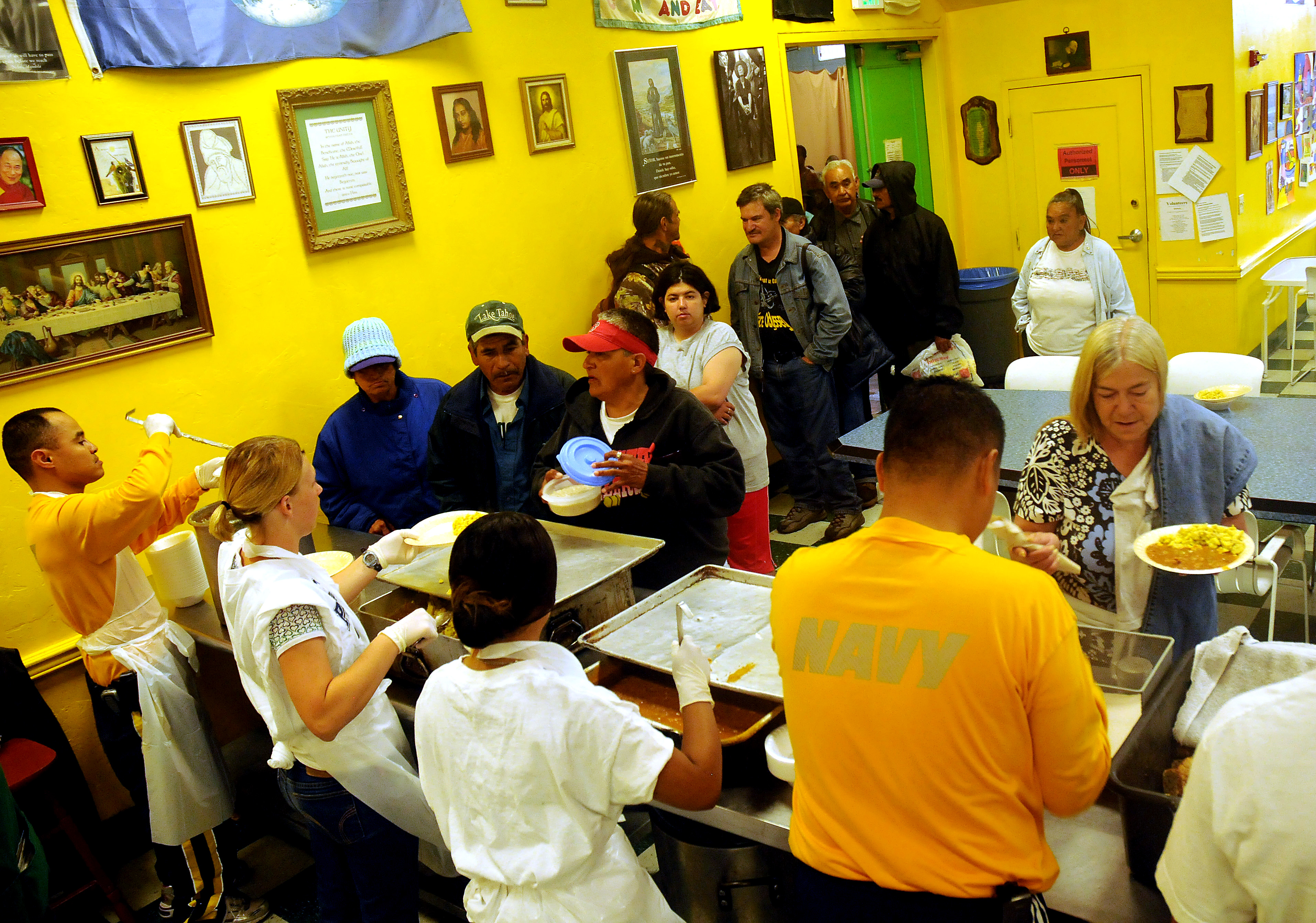
Members of the United States Navy serve homeless people at Dorothy's Soup Kitchen, Salinas, California, in 2009.

In some countries such as the United Kingdom, increased demand from hungry people has largely been met by food banks, operating on the "front line" model, where they give food out directly to hungry people. In the US, such establishments are called "food pantries"; Americans generally reserve the term "food bank" for entities which perform a warehouse-like function, distributing food to front line agencies, but not directly to hungry people themselves. Instead of providing hot meals, front line food banks and pantries hand out packages of groceries so that recipients can cook themselves several meals at home. This is often more convenient for the end user. They can receive food for up to a dozen or so meals at once, whereas with a soup kitchen, they typically only receive a single meal with each visit. (Note: Although some soup kitchens also like to give visitors a second "carry out" meal.)

Food banks typically have procedures needed to prevent unscrupulous people taking advantage of them, unlike soup kitchens which will usually give a meal to whoever turns up with no questions asked. The soup kitchen's greater accessibility can make it more suitable for assisting people with long-term dependence on food aid. Soup kitchens can also provide warmth, companionship, and the shared communal experience of dining with others, which can be especially valued by people such as disabled, pensioners, widowers, homeless and ex-homeless. In some countries such as Greece, soup kitchens have become the most widely used form of food aid, with The Guardian reporting in 2012, that an estimated 400,000 Greeks were visiting a soup kitchen each day.

== See also ==
- Curry Without Worry
- Food Not Bombs
- Langar (Sikhism)
- Langar (Sufism)
- Masbia
- Right to food
- Rumford's Soup
- Souperism
- Volxkuche
- Homeless ministry
- Mole people
- National Welfare Rights Organization
- Pathways out of Poverty (POP)
- The Susso
