= Keith McHenry =

American activist

Keith McHenry is an American activist, best known as the co-founder of Food Not Bombs. He also co-founded Homes Not Jails and contributed to the founding of the Independent Media Center.

== Early life ==
McHenry was born in Frankfurt, West Germany, in 1957, where his father was stationed in the US army. The family then moved to Logan, Utah, while his father earned his master's degree at Utah State. Keith's father became a park ranger in the National Park Service and the family lived at a number of parks including Yosemite, Grand Canyon, Big Bend, Shenandoah and Everglades.

Starting in 1975, McHenry attended Boston University, studying painting and sculpture. He took a class in American history with Howard Zinn. Keith and his work with Food Not Bombs is mentioned in Zinn's A People's History of the United States. Zinn wrote the introduction to McHenry's first two books.

== Activism ==
While at Boston University, McHenry became active with Clamshell Alliance, making several trips to Seabrook, New Hampshire to protest nuclear power. He began to organize actions in cities on the east coast of the United States against nuclear arms and war, while promoting alternative energy and organic gardening. In 1980, he and others started the first Food Not Bombs chapter in Cambridge, Massachusetts. The group provided entertainment and vegetarian meals in Harvard Square and the Boston Common after making deliveries of uncooked food to most of the housing projects and shelters in the area.

In 1988, McHenry moved to San Francisco, where he started a second Food Not Bombs group. He was one of nine volunteers arrested for sharing food and literature at Golden Gate Park on August 15, 1988. In the following years, Keith was arrested over 100 times for serving free food in city parks; he spent over 500 nights in jail. He faced 25 years to life in prison under the California Three Strikes Law, but in 1995, Amnesty International and the United Nations Human Rights Commission brought about his release.

He has started Food Not Bombs groups around the world. He gave up his graphics design career to pursue FNB. In 2005, he helped coordinate food relief as well as shipments of clothing and other supplies to the survivors of Hurricane Katrina. In 2012, he founded the Food Not Bombs Free Skool, which teaches a summer course covering social issues, community organizing, nonviolent social change, cultural events, and sustainable agriculture.

== Controversies ==
In 2017, McHenry went on Kevin Barrett's podcast Truth Jihad to discuss the September 11 attacks as a possible false flag event.

== See also ==
- List of peace activists

== Awards ==
- (1995) Resister of the Year
- (1999) Local Hero Award, San Francisco Bay Guardian
- (2012) Noam Chomsky Award, Justice Studies Association
- (2017) Volunteer Center of Santa Cruz County "Be The Difference Award"
- (2017) American Civil Union "Hammer of Justice Award”
- The Supreme Master Ching Hai International Association "Shining World Compassion Award”

== Publications ==
- Food Not Bombs: How to Feed the Hungry and Build Community - 1992
- HUNGRY FOR PEACE: How you can help end poverty and war with Food Not Bombs 2011
- The Anarchist Cookbook - 2015
