= Volxküche =

Regularly occurring group cooking event

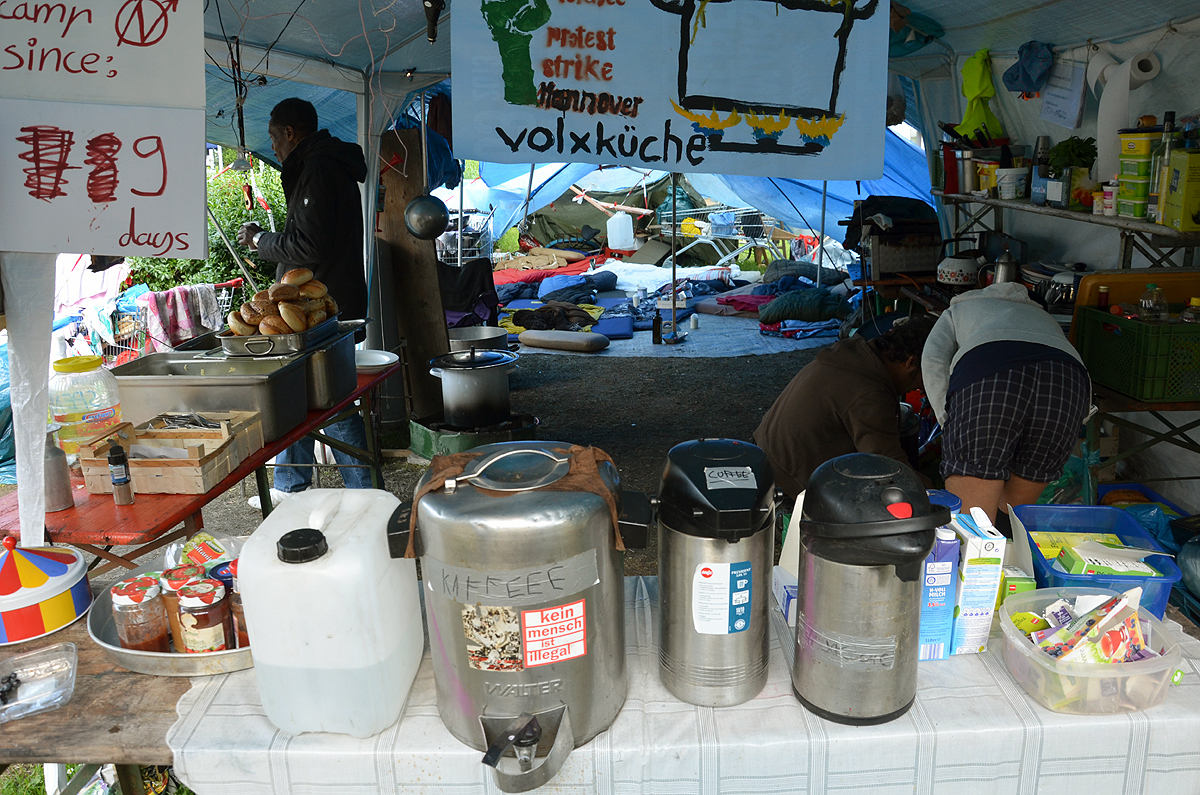
A Volxküche event in Hannover, Germany, 2014

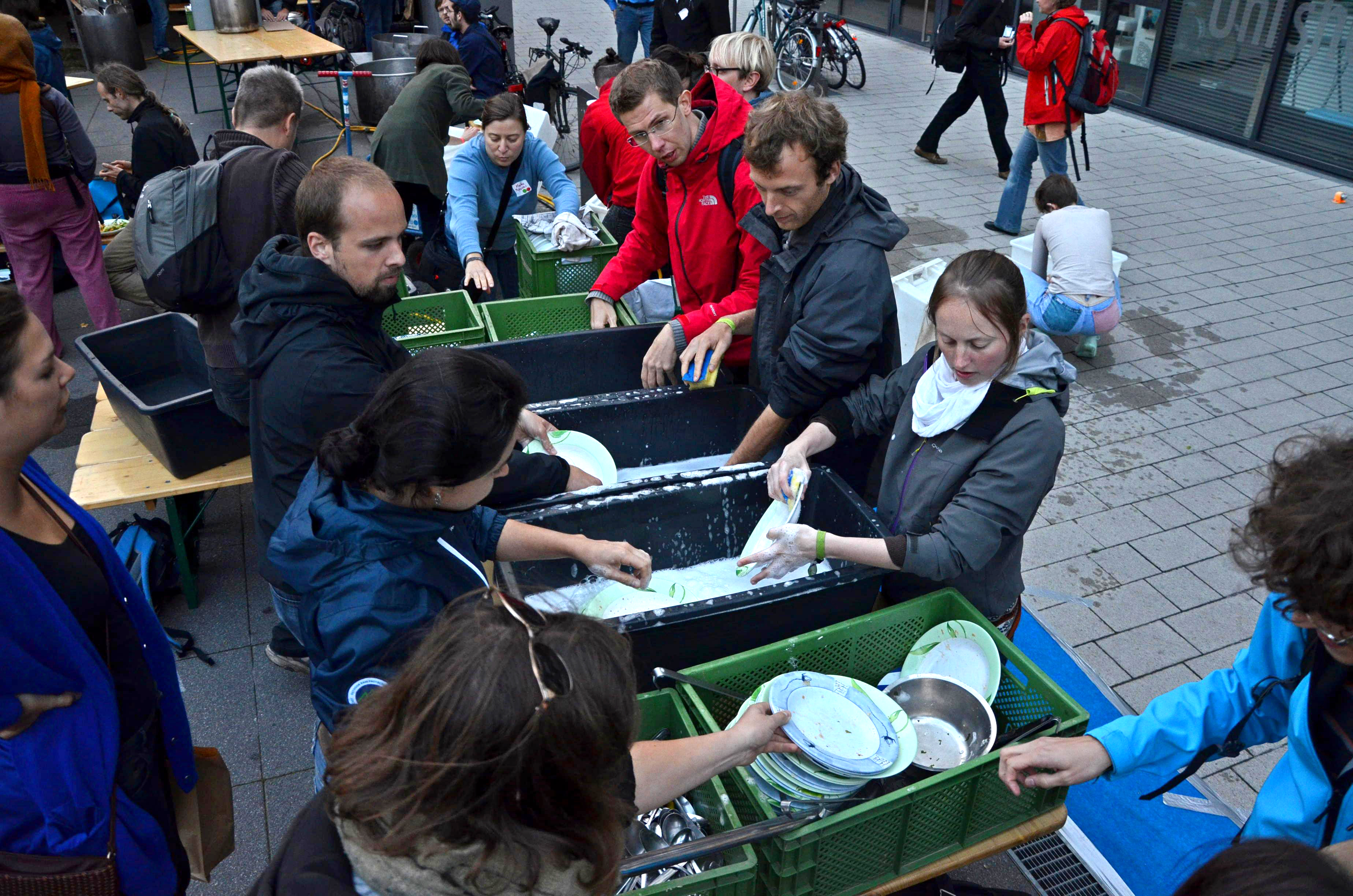
Communal washing up at a degrowth conference in 2014

VolxKüche (VoKü), also Küche für Alle (KüfA) and Bevölkerungsküche (BeVoKü), people's kitchen, free supper club, and kitchen for all are names used for a weekly or regularly occurring group cooking event, at which the meal is served free of charge or at cost.

== History ==
The name derives from the German expression "people's kitchen" (soup kitchen), as a secular counterpart of the Christian soup kitchen. Volxküchen are found usually in collective and/or self-managed arrangements (pubs, information stores, youth centers or autonomous centers) with politically left self-identity. In general at least one vegetarian meal is offered, frequently also vegan food. Often soon to be expired ingredients are obtained at cost, or donated by food banks, food manufacturers or community gardens.

The Volxküche in the current sense arose in the West European squatter scene of the early 1980s. Squatters in the Netherlands use the name volkskeuken or VoKu, cooking vegan or vegetarian food for sale at a cheap price. This fitted beside other networked activities such as local exchange trading systems, Food not Bombs, free shops and food cooperatives. Squatters in the German city of Hamburg founded a Volxküche at the Hafenstraße in 1982. Students in Vienna occupied a lecture theatre in 2009 and started a Volxküche as part of a longterm plan which included making sleeping areas and rooms for events.

A 'Free Supper Club" was held twice a month in San Francisco, US, as of 2013. It called itself VolxKuche San Francisco.

== See also ==
- Freegan
- Homeless ministry
- List of supper clubs
