= Chris Crass =

American anarchist activist (born 1973)

Chris Crass (born c. 1973) is an American anarchist, activist, and writer on topics of anti-racist and feminist organizing.

== Political activism ==
In high school, Chris Crass's best friend introduced him to anarchist politics and punk rock. Crass attended San Francisco State University and was an active organizer in the area's Food Not Bombs chapter from 1993 to 2000. In the 2000s and early 2010s, he was an organizer for immigrant rights.

== Personal life ==
Crass is also a Unitarian Universalist. He lives in Tennessee, with his partner and 2 children (River and August).

== Selected works ==
- "Looking to the Light of Freedom". Globalize Liberation: How to Uproot the System and Build a Better World. City Lights Books. 2003. pp. 427–446. ISBN 978-0-87286-420-7.
- "Tools for White Guys Who are Working for Social Change". Race, Ethnicity, and Gender: Selected Readings. Pine Forge Press. 2007. pp. 458–459. ISBN 978-1-4129-4107-5.
- Towards Collective Liberation: Anti-Racist Organizing, Feminist Praxis and Movement Building Strategy (2013)

== See also ==
- Joel Olson
