= Homes Not Jails =

Social assistance organization in San Francisco

Homes Not Jails is an American organization that is affiliated with the San Francisco Tenants Union. It describes itself as an all-volunteer organization committed to housing homeless people through direct action. The group was formed in 1992. Homes Not Jails does public actions as well as legislative advocacy and squatting (occupying empty buildings for free). Homes Not Jails groups do "housing takeovers", acts of civil disobedience in which vacant buildings are publicly occupied, to demonstrate the availability of vacant property and to advocate that it be used for housing. The group has done many such occupations. Homes Not Jails has also done and assisted with hundreds of "covert" squats in which vacant buildings are broken into so that people in need of housing can move in.

== History ==
Homes Not Jails began in 1992 in the wave of homeless activist groups that began nationwide following the economic recession of the 1980s. In addition to traditional homeless advocacy, Homes Not Jails has used squatting as a tactic since its first public takeover. The group began in fall of 1992 with the takeover of a building at 90 Golden Gate Avenue in the Tenderloin District. On Thanksgiving Day, shortly after this first occupation, the group held a rally and marched to another building at 250 Taylor Street, and publicly occupied it. There were originally about 30 members. Homes Not Jails has had extensive media coverage of its advocacy in support of affordable housing, its covert housing of people in vacant buildings, and its protection of buildings slated for demolition.

San Francisco Supervisor Angela Alioto introduced legislation in 2004 sponsored by Homes Not Jails that would allow the city to seize abandoned buildings and give them to nonprofit housing groups; these could employ homeless people to repair and live in them.

== Sweat equity ==
Sweat equity is the cornerstone of the Homes Not Jails philosophy. It is formulated to address the problem that most affordable housing is unaffordable for people with no income or people on General Assistance, Supplemental Security Income, or Aid to Families with Dependent Children.

== Covert squatting ==
Homes Not Jails relies on lists of addresses supplied by sympathizers and search teams. At least one search team a week has been organized since 1992. On any given search the teams open one to a half-dozen vacant buildings. From 1994 to 1999 over 250 search teams have opened between 700 and 800 buildings.

== See also ==
- Harvey Milk LGBT Democratic Club
- Umoja Village
