= Harvard Street Historic District =

Historic district in Massachusetts, United States

- U.S. National Register of Historic Places
- U.S. Historic district
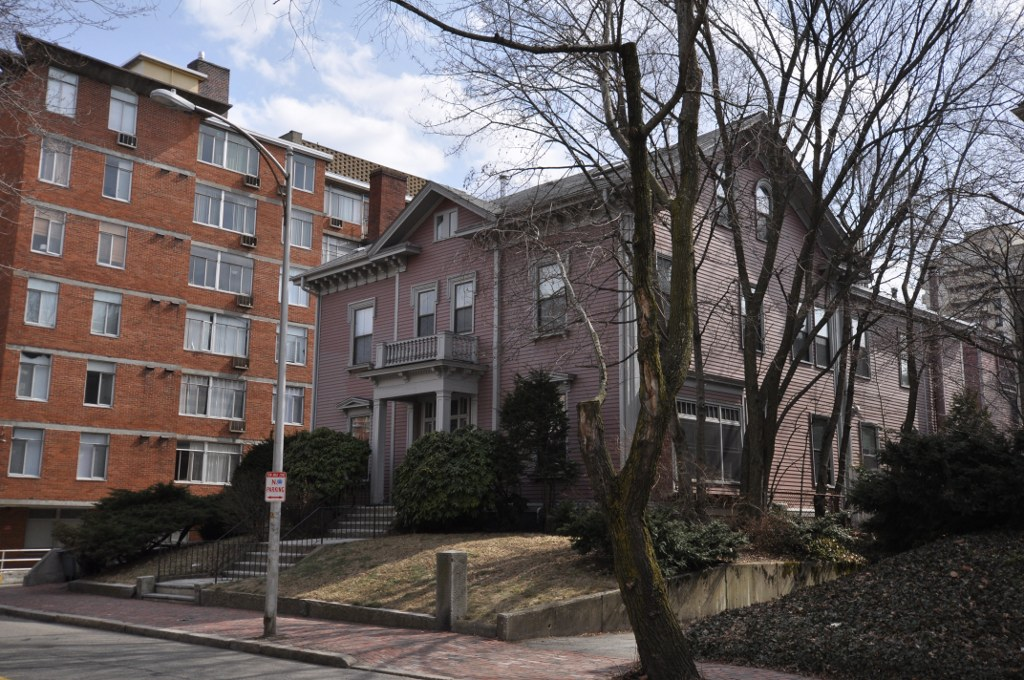
- 336 Harvard Street

- Location within Massachusetts Location within the United States
- Location: Cambridge, Massachusetts
- Coordinates: 42°22′14.7″N 71°6′33.7″W
- Architect: James T. Kelley; Arthur H. Vinal; et al.
- Architectural style: Mid 19th Century Revival, Colonial Revival, Late Victorian
- MPS: Cambridge MRA
- NRHP reference No.: 82001945
- Added to NRHP: April 13, 1982

The Harvard Street Historic District is a historic district on Harvard Street between Ellery and Hancock Streets in Cambridge, Massachusetts. It includes houses on both sides of the street, numbered from 335 to 344 inclusive, an area that marks the summit of Dana Hill. Harvard Street was laid out as a direct route from "Old Cambridge" (now Harvard Square) to Boston in the early 1800s, and was run over Dana Hill over the objection of Judge Francis Dana, whose estate sat on top of the hill. The street was developed over the 19th century with a succession of high-quality houses.

This cluster of seven well-preserved houses was built primarily in the 1850s; two Colonial Revival houses, one at #337 built in 1887, the other at #340 built in 1897, were the only ones built later. Stylistically the other five are a diverse representation of revival styles popular in the mid-19th century, with only the Italianate style represented twice (by #341–43 and #336). One of the more notable residents in the district was Samuel B. Rindge, a merchant and banker who was father to Frederick H. Rindge, a major benefactor of the city. The Rindges lived at #342–44, a Second Empire house.

Several houses were designed by architects, and the design for at least one, the Gothic Revival house at #338, came from a pattern book. The Colonial Revival house at #337 was designed by James T. Kelley, and #340 was designed by Arthur H. Vinal.

The district was added to the National Register of Historic Places in 1982.

== See also ==
- National Register of Historic Places listings in Cambridge, Massachusetts
