= Curry Without Worry =

Nepalese soup kitchen in San Francisco

- Logo of the charity
- Formation: 2006; 20 years ago
- Founder: Shrawan Nepali
- Type: Soup kitchen
- Headquarters: San Francisco, California, U.S.
- President: Jesse Seaver
- Website: currywithoutworry.org

Curry Without Worry is a San Francisco, California-based soup kitchen known for its menu of Nepalese cuisine. The charity serves free dinner to mostly impoverished persons on Tuesday afternoons from kiosks that simultaneously operate in San Francisco and Kathmandu. Curry Without Worry also encourages "successful people" to eat at its kiosks as a way to emphasize similarities between persons of different economic strata. Meals are vegan and typically include rice, kwati, curried vegetables, spicy achar, timur chutney and flatbread.

== History ==
Curry Without Worry was founded in 2006 by Shrawan Nepali, an immigrant to the United States from Nepal. Nepali used the profits from a San Francisco-area restaurant in which he was a part owner to start the organization. The charity's president is Jesse Seaver.
