= Joel Olson =

American activist and political theorist (1967–2012)

Joel Karleton Olson
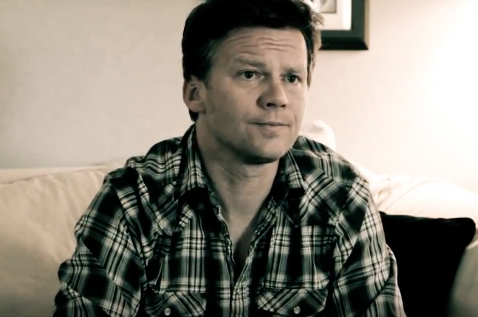
- Born: November 4, 1967; Ypsilanti, Michigan, US
- Died: March 29, 2012 (aged 44); Nottingham, UK
- Occupations: Scholar, professor

Academic background
- Education: University of Minnesota (PhD)
- Thesis: The democratic problem of the white citizen (2001)

Academic work
- Discipline: Political scientist
- Sub-discipline: Whiteness studies specialist
- Institutions: Northern Arizona University
- Main interests: Whiteness studies, extremism

Joel Olson (1967–2012) was an American associate professor of political theory at Northern Arizona University in Flagstaff and a social justice activist.

== Biography ==
Olson graduated in 2001 with a PhD in political theory from the University of Minnesota. Inspired by the work of abolitionists and African-American Sociologist W.E.B. Du Bois, his dissertation examined the interconnection between race and democracy. From his dissertation, he published his book The Abolition of White Democracy (2004, University of Minnesota Press). At the time of his death, he was building a theory of fanaticism or extremism that would explain the politics of Pro-Life assassins, abolitionists, green anarchists, and Al-Qaeda. The work was titled American Zealot: Fanaticism and Democracy in the United States.

Although a university professor, Olson rejected intellectual-worker and activist-theorist divides, engaging in politics on the streets, canvassing, building community support. Over his life, he worked in and helped found groups like Bring the Ruckus, Cop Watch, and the Repeal Coalition.

This latest effort was initiated in 2008 in response to an increased oppression of immigrants and those perceived to be immigrants in Arizona. The Repeal Coalition, co-founded by Olson and other members of the Flagstaff community, focuses on repealing all anti-immigration legislation and providing support for the immigrant community. As their web states, the group is "an organization committed to repealing over 60 anti-immigrant laws and bills that have been passed or considered by Arizona politicians in the past few years. We demand the repeal of all laws — federal, state, and local — that degrade and discriminate against undocumented individuals and that deny U.S. citizens their lawful rights."

The following quote of Olson's was turned into a plaque on a memorial outdoor classroom between the buildings of the College of Social and Behavioral Sciences at NAU: "What is the most damage I can do, given my biography, abilities, and commitments, to the racial order and rule of capital?"

Olson died the night after he gave a lecture at the University of Nottingham in the United Kingdom in March 2012 whilst he was on an international teaching exchange with the University of Alicante. His body was found in his room at the Hugh Stewart Hall. No serious health issues leading to the cause of death could be ascertained by the pathologist "other than natural causes."

He and his wife Audrey Creed had three children.
