= Homeless ministry =

Christian organization

Homeless ministry is the intentional interaction between Christians and homeless persons, regardless of their faith. The ministering typically occurs in the environment in which the homeless reside. It may include distribution of provisions such as food, clothing, and blankets. The ministry often involves building relationships with the homeless and providing them with information and relational care. Prayer, conversation, and ministering to spiritual needs are part of the process.

== See also ==
- Homelessness
- Volxkuche
