= Great Lockdown =

The Great Lockdown has been used to refer to a number of topics related to the COVID-19 pandemic which occurred in 2020:

- The pandemic as a whole
- COVID-19 lockdowns
- Travel restrictions related to the COVID-19 pandemic
- COVID-19 recession
