= Global economic crisis =

Global economic crisis may refer to:

- Economic events of the 21st Century:
  - 2008 financial crisis
  - Great Recession
  - The 2020 stock market crash
- A global recession
- Earlier global economic events, such as:
  - The Great Depression, a global economic downturn from the late 1920s until World War II
  - The Long Depression, an international depression that began in 1873
