= COVID-19 recession =

Economic downturn, primarily due to the COVID-19 pandemic

- Map showing real GDP growth rates in 2020, recorded by the International Monetary Fund as of 26 January 2021; countries in brown are those that have faced a recession.
- Date: 20 February 2020 – late 2020
- Type: Global recession
- Cause: Impact of the COVID-19 pandemic and the subsequent COVID-19 lockdowns
- Outcome: 2020 stock market crash; Sharp rise in unemployment; Collapse of the tourism industry; Collapse of the hospitality industry; Collapse of the price of oil; Collapse of small businesses; Destabilization and collapse of the energy industry; Increase in government debt; Increase in economic inequality; Major downturn in consumer activity; Market liquidity crisis; Protests, riots, and civil unrest; Trade disruption and shortages; 2022 stock market decline; Increased inflation; The Powell put and the everything bubble

The COVID-19 recession was a global economic recession caused by COVID-19 lockdowns. The recession began in most countries in February 2020. After a year of global economic slowdown that saw stagnation of economic growth and consumer activity, the COVID-19 lockdowns and other precautions taken in early 2020 drove the global economy into crisis. Within seven months, every advanced economy had fallen into recession.

The first major sign of recession was the 2020 stock market crash, which saw major indices drop 20 to 30% in late February and March. Recovery began in early April 2020; by April 2022, the GDP for most major economies had either returned to or exceeded pre-pandemic levels and many market indices recovered or even set new records by late 2020.

The recession saw unusually high and rapid increases in unemployment in many countries. By September–October 2020, where every advanced & emerging economy had already fallen into a recession or depression more than 10 million unemployment cases had been filed in just the United States alone swamping state-funded unemployment insurance computer systems and processes. The United Nations (UN) in April 2020 had also predicted that global unemployment would wipe out 6.7% of working hours globally in the second quarter of 2020—equivalent to 195 million full-time workers. In some countries, unemployment was expected to be around 10%, with more severely affected nations from the pandemic having higher unemployment rates. Developing countries were also affected by a drop in remittances and exacerbating COVID-19 pandemic-related famines.

The recession and the accompanying 2020 Russia–Saudi Arabia oil price war led to a drop in oil prices; the collapse of tourism, the hospitality industry, and the energy industry; and a downturn in consumer activity in comparison to the previous decade. The 2021–2023 global energy crisis was driven by a global surge in demand as the world exited the early recession caused by pandemic-related lockdown measures, particularly due to strong energy demand in Asia. This was then further exacerbated by the reaction to escalations of the Russo-Ukrainian war, culminating in the Russian invasion of Ukraine and the 2022 Russian debt default. Five years after the 2020 global recession, global income per person is about 10 percent higher than in 2019, according to the World Bank.

== Background ==
=== Corporate debt bubble ===
After the 2008 financial crisis, there was a large increase in corporate debt, rising from 84% of gross world product in 2009 to 92% in 2019, or about $72 trillion. In the world's eight largest economies—China, United States, Japan, United Kingdom, France, Spain, Italy, and Germany—total corporate debt was about $51 trillion in 2019, compared to $34 trillion in 2009. If the economic climate worsens, companies with high levels of debt run the risk of being unable to make their interest payments to lenders or refinance their debt, forcing them into restructuring. The Institute of International Finance forecast in 2019 that, in an economic downturn half as severe as the 2008 crisis, $19 trillion in debt would be owed by non-financial firms without the earnings to cover the interest payments on the debt they issued. The McKinsey Global Institute warned in 2018 that the greatest risks would be to emerging markets such as China, India, and Brazil, where 25–30% of bonds have been issued by high-risk companies.

=== 2019 global economic slowdown ===
During 2019, the IMF reported that the world economy was going through a "synchronized slowdown", which entered into its slowest pace since the 2008 financial crisis. 'Cracks' were showing in the consumer market as global markets began to suffer through a 'sharp deterioration' of manufacturing activity. Global growth was believed to have peaked in 2017, when the world's total industrial output began to start a sustained decline in early 2018. The IMF blamed 'heightened trade and geopolitical tensions' as the main reason for the slowdown, citing Brexit and the China–United States trade war as primary reasons for slowdown in 2019, while other economists blamed liquidity issues.

In April 2019, the U.S. yield curve inverted, which sparked fears of a 2020 recession across the world. The inverted yield curve and China–U.S. trade war fears prompted a sell-off in global stock markets during March 2019, which prompted more fears that a recession was imminent. Rising debt levels in the European Union and the United States had always been a concern for economists. However, in 2019, that concern was heightened during the economic slowdown, and economists began warning of a 'debt bomb' occurring during the next financial crisis. Debt in 2019 was 50% higher than that during the 2008 financial crisis. Economists have argued that this increased debt is what led to debt defaults in economies and businesses across the world during the recession. The first signs of trouble leading up to the collapse occurred in September 2019, when the US Federal Reserve began intervening in the role of investor to provide funds in the repo markets; the overnight repo rate spiked above an unprecedented 6% during that time, which would play a crucial factor in triggering the events that led up to the crash.

==== Trump tariffs against China ====
From 2018 to early 2020, U.S. President Donald Trump set tariffs and other trade barriers on China with the goal of forcing it to make changes to what the U.S. described as "unfair trade practices". Among those trade practices and their effects had been the growing trade deficit, the theft of intellectual property, and the forced transfer of American technology to China.

Trump's tariffs caused significant damage to the economy of countries around the world. In the United States, it brought struggles for farmers and manufacturers and higher prices for consumers, which resulted in the U.S. manufacturing industry entering into a "mild recession" during 2019. In other countries it also caused economic damage, including violent protests in Chile and Ecuador due to transport and energy price surges, though some countries had benefited from increased manufacturing to fill the gaps. It also led to stock market instability. Governments around the world took steps to address some of the damage caused by the tariffs. During the recession, the downturn of consumerism and manufacturing from the trade war is believed to have worsened the economic crisis.

==== Brexit ====
In Europe, the UK's planned withdrawal from the EU (Brexit) created uncertainty that weighed on the UK economy from 2016 to 2019, particularly by dampening business investment. UK growth was subdued in 2019, with GDP roughly flat in the fourth quarter. Across the EU, growth also slowed that year, mainly due to global trade tensions and a manufacturing slump, while Brexit-related uncertainty was a contributing factor rather than the primary cause. Some firms, especially in financial services, moved parts of their operations and assets from the UK to EU cities ahead of Brexit, though these were typically partial relocations. The larger, measurable effects on UK–EU trade volumes became clearer after the transition ended in 2021, when new trading arrangements took effect.

=== Aggravating circumstances ===
==== Evergrande liquidity crisis in 2021 ====
In August 2021, it was reported that China's second-largest property developer, Evergrande Group, was entrenched in $300 billion (~$351 billion in 2025) of debt. As the company missed several payment deadlines in September 2021, it seemed likely the company would fail without government intervention, as stocks within the company having already plummeted by 85%. Since China is the second largest economy in the world and property makes up a large amount of their GDP, it threatens to destabilise the COVID-19 recession even further, especially considering China is currently deep within a housing bubble eclipsing the United States housing bubble that led to the previous global recession.

==== 2021–2023 global energy crisis and sanctions on Russia ====
The 2021–2023 global energy shortage is the most recent in a series of cyclical energy shortages experienced over the last fifty years. The Russian military buildup outside Ukraine and subsequent invasion have also threatened the energy supply from Russia to Europe, while increasing the cost of oil causing European countries to diversify their source of energy import. The economic fallout from the 2021–2023 global energy crisis and the 2022 Russian invasion of Ukraine has had an impact on oil prices worldwide, most notably the unprecedented measures taken on the SWIFT System and Tit-for-Tat Responses to comprehensive sanctions from other countries. Preceding an official announcement regarding import bans on 8 March 2022, there were reports of proposed bans regarding Russian oil and gas imports by the US and the EU.

This was in addition to the already existing actions taken by American companies on multiple Russian entities with ties to the Russian government, with Russia's trading status also being called into question on security grounds. Prior to the ban having been implemented, the value of the Russian ruble had dropped by record levels as the price of oil hit a 14-year high. The talks about whether or not to implement an International Energy Embargo were already reported to have been impacting the Russian oil market due to pre-existing fears by investors by 10 March, there were reports stating that Russia's debt rating was downgraded by Fitch from "B" to "C", indicating a potential default was imminent. This ultimately came to pass after 27 June with the 2022 Russian debt default.

== Causes ==
The COVID-19 pandemic is the most disruptive pandemic since the Spanish flu in 1918. When the pandemic first arose in late 2019 and more consequently in 2020, the world was going through economic stagnation and significant consumer downturn. Most economists believed a recession, though one which would not be particularly severe, was coming. As a result of the rapid spread of the pandemic, economies across the world initiated population lockdowns to curb the spread of the pandemic. This resulted in the collapse of various industries and consumerism all at once, which put major pressure on banks and employment. This caused a stock market crash and, thereafter, the recession. With new social distancing measures taken in response to the pandemic, lockdowns occurred across much of the world economy.

=== COVID-19 pandemic ===
The COVID-19 pandemic was a pandemic of Coronavirus disease 2019 (COVID-19) caused by severe acute respiratory syndrome coronavirus 2 (SARS-CoV-2); the outbreak was identified in Wuhan, China, in December 2019, declared to be a Public Health Emergency of International Concern from 30 January 2020 to 5 May 2023, and recognized as a pandemic by the World Health Organization on 11 March 2020. The response to the pandemic led to severe global economic disruption, the postponement or cancellation of sporting, religious, political and cultural events, and widespread shortages of supplies exacerbated by panic buying. Schools, universities and colleges closed either on a nationwide or local basis in 63 countries, affecting approximately 47 percent of the world's student population. Many governments restricted or advised against all non-essential travel to and from countries and areas affected by the outbreak. However, the virus is already spreading within communities in large parts of the world, with many not knowing where or how they were infected.

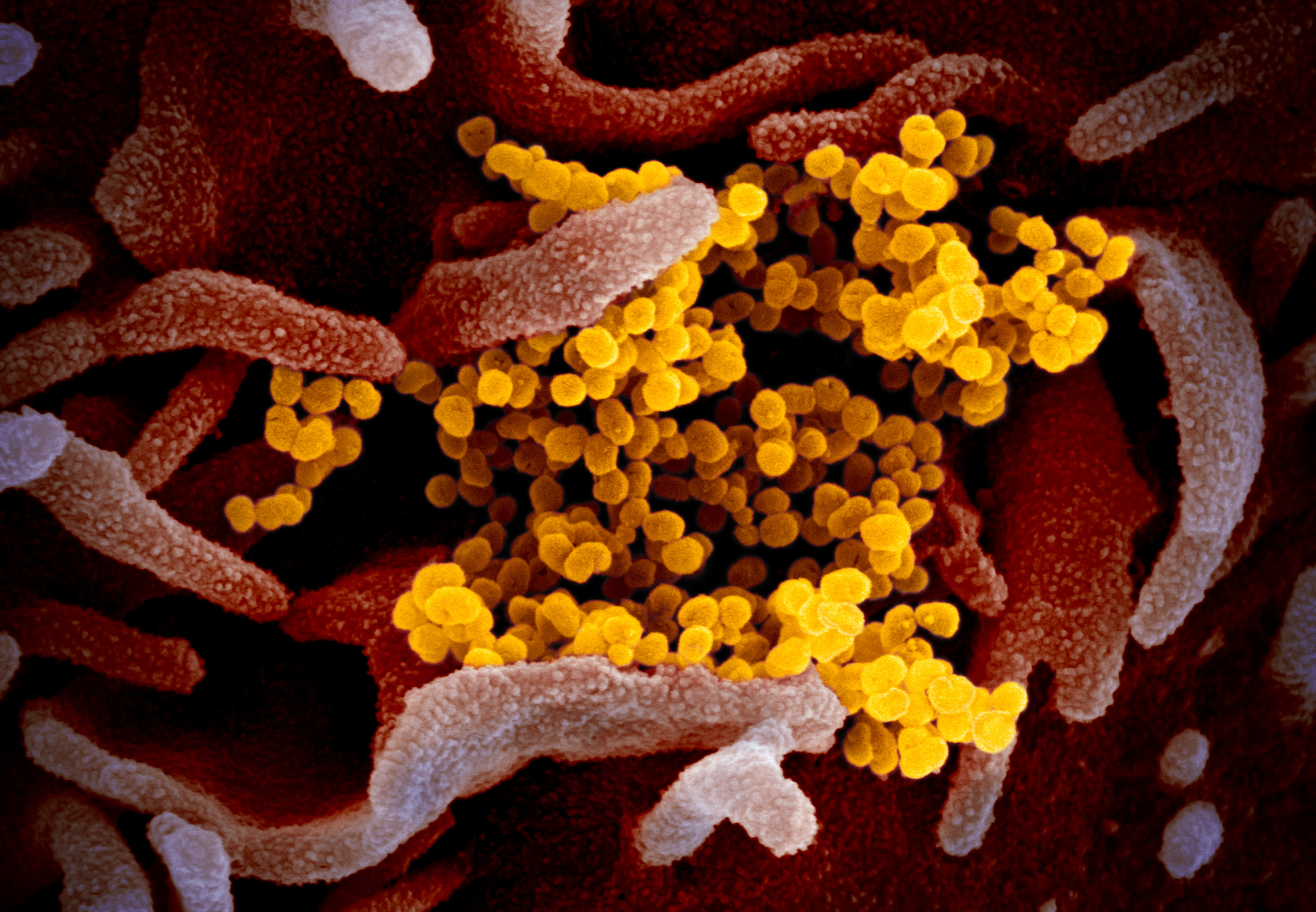
Scanning electron microscope image of SARS-CoV-2 (centre, yellow)

The COVID-19 pandemic has had far-reaching consequences beyond the spread of the disease and efforts to quarantine it. As the pandemic spread around the globe, concerns shifted from supply-side manufacturing issues to decreased business in the services sector. The pandemic is considered unanimously as a major factor in causing the recession. The pandemic affected nearly every major industry negatively, was one of the main causes of the stock market crash and resulted in major restrictions of social liberties and movement.

The COVID-19 crisis affected worldwide economic activity, resulting in a 7% drop in global commercial commerce in 2020. While global value chains (GVC) persisted, several demand and supply mismatches caused by the pandemic resurfaced throughout the recovery period and spread internationally through trade.

During the first wave of the COVID-19 pandemic, businesses lost 25% of their revenue and 11% of their workforce, with contact-intensive sectors and SMEs being particularly heavily impacted. However, considerable policy assistance helped to avert large-scale bankruptcies, with just 4% of enterprises declaring for insolvency or permanently shutting at the time of the COVID wave.

Aid to people and businesses in the form of employment retention schemes, subsidies, tax relief, and loan guarantee programs totalled roughly 9% of GDP, with substantial cross-country variance, which might reflect policy space and development levels. In the face of considerable liquidity challenges, debt moratoriums and revisions to bankruptcy rules also safeguarded businesses and people during the COVID-19 pandemic.

In response to the pandemic's infection rates and death toll, countries in the Western Balkans, the Eastern Neighborhood, and Central and Eastern Europe faced severe recessions.

=== Lockdowns ===
While stay-at-home orders clearly affect many types of business, especially those that provide in-person services (including retail stores, restaurants and hotels, entertainment venues and museums, medical offices, and beauty salons and spas), government orders are not the sole pressure on those businesses. In the United States, people began to change their economic behavior 10–20 days before their local governments declared stay-at-home orders, and by May, changes in individuals' rates of movement (according to smartphone data) did not always correlate with local laws. According to a 2021 study, only 7% of the decline in economic activity was due to government-imposed restrictions on activity; the vast majority of the decline was due to individuals voluntarily disengaging from commerce.

=== Russia–Saudi Arabia oil price war ===
The reduction in the demand for travel and the lack of factory activity due to the COVID-19 pandemic significantly impacted demand for oil, causing its price to fall. The Russian–Saudi Arabia oil price war further worsened the recession, due to it crashing the price of oil. In mid-February, the International Energy Agency forecasted that oil demand growth in 2020 would be the smallest since 2011. A slump in Chinese demand resulted in a meeting of the Organization of the Petroleum Exporting Countries (OPEC) to discuss a potential cut in production to balance the loss in demand. The cartel initially made a tentative agreement to cut oil production by 1.5 million barrels per day following a meeting in Vienna on 5 March 2020, which would bring the production levels to the lowest it has been since the Iraq War.

After OPEC and Russia failed to agree on oil production cuts on 6 March and Saudi Arabia and Russia both announced increases in oil production on 7 March, oil prices fell by 25 percent. On 8 March, Saudi Arabia unexpectedly announced that it would increase production of crude oil and sell it at a discount (of $6–8 a barrel) to customers in Asia, the US, and Europe, following the breakdown of negotiations, as Russia resisted calls to cut production. The biggest discounts targeted Russian oil customers in northwestern Europe.

Prior to the announcement, the price of oil had gone down by more than 30% since the start of the year, and upon Saudi Arabia's announcement, it dropped a further 30 percent, though later recovered somewhat. Brent Crude, an oil market used to price two-thirds of the world's crude oil supplies, experienced the largest drop since the 1991 Gulf War on the night of 8 March. Concurrently, the price of West Texas Intermediate, another market used as a benchmark for global oil prices, fell to its lowest level since February 2016. Energy expert Bob McNally noted, "This is the first time since 1930 and '31 that a massive negative demand shock has coincided with a supply shock;" in that case it was the Smoot–Hawley Tariff Act precipitating a collapse in international trade during the Great Depression, coinciding with discovery of the East Texas Oil Field during the Texas oil boom. Fears surrounding the Russian–Saudi Arabian oil price war caused a plunge in U.S. stocks, and have had a particular impact on American producers of shale oil.

In early April 2020, Saudi Arabia and Russia both agreed to cut their oil production. Reuters reported that "If Saudi Arabia failed to rein in output, US senators called on the White House to impose sanctions on Riyadh, pull out US troops from the kingdom and impose import tariffs on Saudi oil." The price of oil briefly went negative on 20 April 2020.

== Financial crisis ==
Movement of the DJIA between January 2017 and December 2020

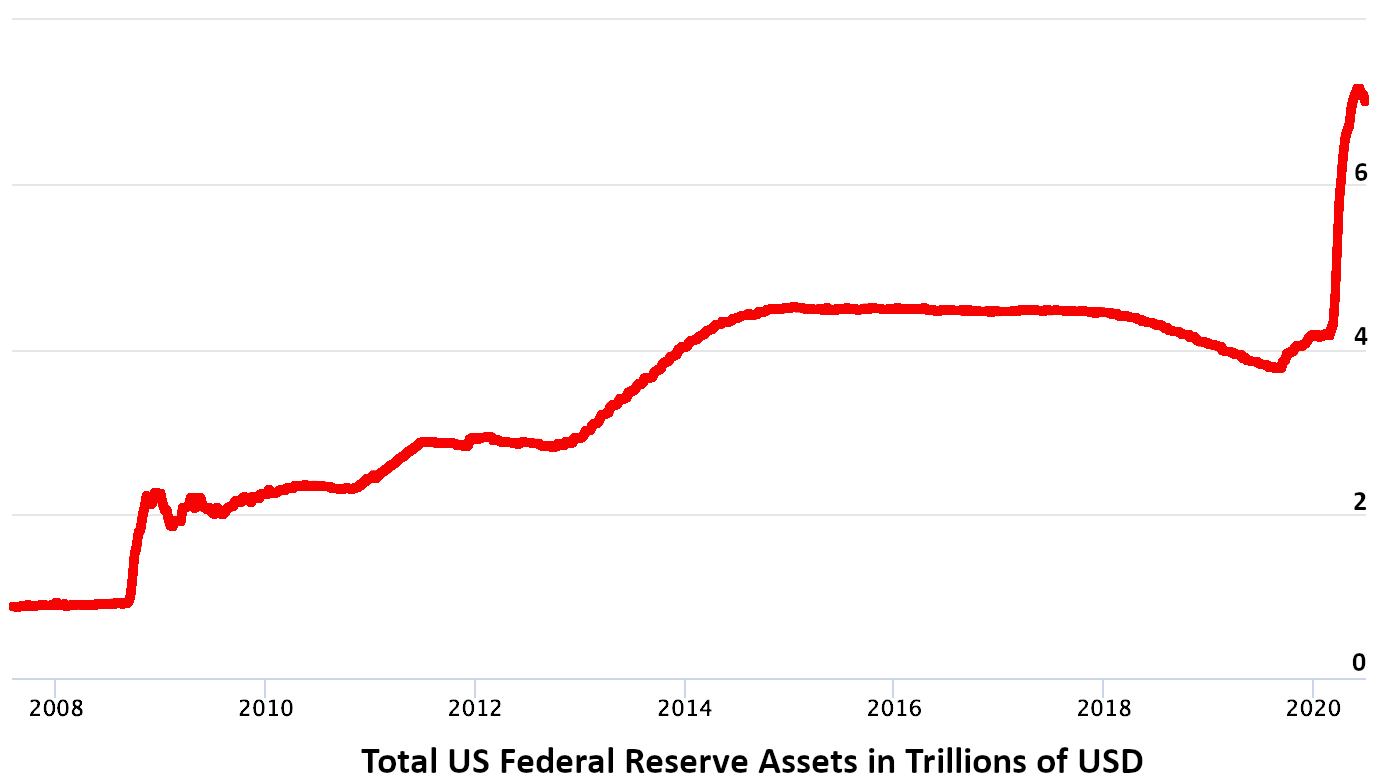
The Federal Reserve balance sheet expanded greatly through quantitative easing on multiple occurrences between 2008 and mid-2020. During September 2019, there was a spike in the overnight repo interest rate, which caused the Federal Reserve to recommence quantitative easing; the balance sheet expanded parabolically after the pandemic declaration.

The 2020 stock market crash began on 20 February 2020, although the economic aspects of the COVID-19 recession began to materialize in late 2019. Due to COVID-19 lockdowns, global markets, banks and businesses were all facing crises not seen since the Great Depression in 1929.

From 24 to 28 February, stock markets declined the most in a week since the 2008 financial crisis, thus entering a correction. Global markets into early March became extremely volatile, with large swings occurring. On 9 March, most global markets reported severe contractions, mainly in response to the COVID-19 pandemic and an oil price war between Russia and the OPEC countries led by Saudi Arabia. This became colloquially known as Black Monday I, and at the time was the worst drop since the Great Recession in 2008.

Three days after Black Monday I there was another drop, Black Thursday, where stocks across Europe and North America fell more than 9%. Wall Street experienced its largest single-day percentage drop since Black Monday in 1987, and the FTSE MIB of the Borsa Italiana fell nearly 17%, becoming the worst-hit market during Black Thursday. Despite a temporary rally on 13 March (with markets posting their best day since 2008), all three Wall Street indexes fell more than 12% when markets re-opened on 16 March. During this time, one benchmark stock market index in all G7 countries and 14 of the G20 countries had been declared to be in Bear markets.

=== Black Monday I (9 March) ===
==== Crash ====
Prior to opening, the Dow Jones Industrial Average futures market experienced a 1,300-point drop based on the pandemic and fall in the oil price described above, triggering a trading curb, or circuit breaker, that caused the futures market to suspend trading for 15 minutes. This predicted 1,300-point drop on 9 March would be among the most points the Dow Jones Industrial Average has dropped in a single day. When the market opened on 9 March, the Dow Jones Industrial Average plummeted 1800 points on opening, 500 points lower than the prediction.

The United States' Dow Jones Industrial Average lost more than 2000 points, described by The News International as "the biggest ever fall in intraday trading". The Dow Jones Industrial Average hit a number of trading "circuit breakers" to curb panicked selling. Oil firms Chevron and ExxonMobil fell about 15%. The Nasdaq Composite, also in the United States, lost over 620 points. The S&P 500 fell by 7.6%. Oil prices fell 22%, and the yields on 10-year and 30-year U.S. Treasury securities fell below 0.40% and 1.02% respectively. Canada's S&P/TSX Composite Index finished the day off by more than 10%. Brazil's IBOVESPA gave up 12%, erasing over 15 months of gains for the index. Australia's ASX 200 lost 7.3%—its biggest daily drop since 2008, though it rebounded later in the day. London's FTSE 100 lost 7.7%, suffering its worst drop since the 2008 financial crisis. BP and Shell Oil experienced intraday price drops of nearly 20% The FTSE MIB, CAC 40, and DAX tanked as well, with Italy affected the most as the COVID-19 pandemic in the country continues. They fell 11.2%, 8.4%, and 7.9% respectively. The STOXX Europe 600 fell to more than 20% below its peak earlier in the year. In a number of Asian markets—Japan, Singapore, the Philippines and Indonesia—shares declined over 20% from their most recent peaks, entering bear market territory. In Japan, the Nikkei 225 plummeted 5.1%. In Singapore, the Straits Times Index fell 6.03%. In China, the CSI 300 Index lost 3%. In Hong Kong, the Hang Seng index sank 4.2%. In Pakistan, the PSX saw the largest ever intra-day plunge in the country's history, losing 2,302 points or 6.0%. The market closed with the KSE 100 Index down 3.1%. In India, the BSE SENSEX closed 1,942 points lower at 35,635 while the NSE Nifty 50 was down by 538 points to 10,451.

The Washington Post posited that pandemic-related turmoil could spark a collapse of the corporate debt bubble, sparking and worsening a recession. The Central Bank of Russia announced that it would suspend foreign exchange market purchases in domestic markets for 30 days, while the Central Bank of Brazil auctioned an additional $3.465 billion the foreign exchange market in two separate transactions and the Bank of Mexico increased its foreign exchange auctions program from $20 billion to $30 billion. After announcing a $120 billion fiscal stimulus programs on 2 December, Japanese Prime Minister Shinzo Abe announced additional government spending, while Indonesian Finance Minister Sri Mulyani announced additional stimulus as well.

=== Black Thursday (12 March) ===
Black Thursday was a global stock market crash on 12 March 2020, as part of the greater 2020 stock market crash. US stock markets suffered from the greatest single-day percentage fall since the 1987 stock market crash. Following Black Monday three days earlier, Black Thursday was attributed to the COVID-19 pandemic and a lack of investor confidence in US President Donald Trump after he declared a 30-day travel ban against the Schengen Area. Additionally, the European Central Bank, under the lead of Christine Lagarde, decided to not cut interest rates despite market expectations, leading to a drop in S&P 500 futures of more than 200 points in less than an hour.

Bank Indonesia announced open market purchases of Rp4 trillion (or $276.53 million) in government bonds, while Bank Indonesia Governor Perry Warjiyo stated that Bank Indonesia's open market purchases of government bonds had climbed to Rp130 trillion on the year and Rp110 trillion since the end of January. Despite declining to cut its deposit rate, the European Central Bank increased its asset purchases by €120 billion (or $135 billion), while the Federal Reserve announced $1.5 trillion in open market purchases. Australian Prime Minister Scott Morrison announced a A$17.6 billion fiscal stimulus package. The Reserve Bank of India announced that it would conduct a six-month $2 billion currency swap for U.S. dollars, while the Reserve Bank of Australia announced A$8.8 billion in repurchases of government bonds. The Central Bank of Brazil auctioned $1.78 billion Foreign exchange spots.

Asia-Pacific stock markets closed down (with the Nikkei 225 of the Tokyo Stock Exchange, the Hang Seng Index of the Hong Kong Stock Exchange, and the IDX Composite of the Indonesia Stock Exchange falling to more than 20% below their 52-week highs), European stock markets closed down 11% (with the FTSE 100 Index on the London Stock Exchange, the DAX on the Frankfurt Stock Exchange, the CAC 40 on the Euronext Paris, and the FTSE MIB on the Borsa Italiana all closing more than 20% below their most recent peaks), while the Dow Jones Industrial Average closed down an additional 10% (eclipsing the one-day record set on 9 March), the NASDAQ Composite was down 9.4%, and the S&P 500 was down 9.5% (with the NASDAQ and S&P 500 also falling to more than 20% below their peaks), and the declines activated the trading curb at the New York Stock Exchange for the second time that week. Oil prices dropped by 8%, while the yields on 10-year and 30-year U.S. Treasury securities increased to 0.86% and 1.45% (and their yield curve finished normal).

==== Crash ====
The US's Dow Jones Industrial Average and S&P 500 Index suffered from the greatest single-day percentage fall since the 1987 stock market crash, as did the UK's FTSE 100, which fell 10.87%. The Canadian S&P/TSX Composite Index dropped 12%, its largest one-day drop since 1940. The FTSE MIB Italian index closed with a 16.92% loss, the worst in its history. Germany's DAX fell 12.24% and France's CAC 12.28%. In Brazil, the IBOVESPA plummeted 14.78%, after trading in the B3 was halted twice within the business hours of the day; it also moved below the 70,000 mark before closing above it. The NIFTY 50 on the National Stock Exchange of India fell 7.89% to more than 20% below its most recent peak, while the BSE SENSEX on the Bombay Stock Exchange fell 2,919 (or 8.18%) to 32,778. The benchmark stock market index on the Johannesburg Stock Exchange fell by 9.3%. The MERVAL on the Buenos Aires Stock Exchange fell 9.5% to 19.5% on the week. 12 March was the second time, following 9 March, that the 7%-drop circuit breaker was triggered since being implemented in 2013.

In Colombia, the peso set an all-time low against the U.S. dollar, when it traded above 4000 pesos for the first time on record. The Mexican peso also set an all-time record low against the U.S. dollar, trading at 22.99 pesos.

=== Black Monday II (16 March) ===
Over the preceding weekend, the Saudi Arabian Monetary Authority announced a $13 billion credit-line package to small- and medium-sized companies, while South African President Cyril Ramaphosa announced a fiscal stimulus package. The Federal Reserve announced that it would cut the federal funds rate target to 0%–0.25%, lower reserve requirements to zero, and begin a $700 billion quantitative easing program.

Dow futures tumbled more than 1,000 points and Standard & Poor's 500 futures dropped 5%, triggering a circuit breaker. On Monday 16 March, Asia-Pacific and European stock markets closed down (with the S&P/ASX 200 setting a one-day record fall of 9.7%, collapsing 30% from the peak that was reached on 20 February). The Dow Jones Industrial Average, the NASDAQ Composite, and the S&P 500 all fell by 12–13%, with the Dow eclipsing the one-day drop record set on 12 March and the trading curb being activated at the beginning of trading for the third time (after 9 and 12 March). Oil prices fell by 10%, while the yields on 10-year and 30-year U.S. Treasury securities fell to 0.76% and 1.38% respectively (while their yield curve remained normal for the third straight trading session).

The Cboe Volatility Index closed at 82.69 on 16 March, the highest ever closing for the index (though there were higher intraday peaks in 2008). Around noon on 16 March, the Federal Reserve Bank of New York announced that it would conduct a $500 billion repurchase through the afternoon of that day. Indonesian Finance Minister Sri Mulyani announced an additional Rp22 trillion in tax-related fiscal stimulus. The Central Bank of the Republic of Turkey lowered its reserve requirement from 8% to 6%. The Bank of Japan announced that it would not cut its bank rate lower from minus 0.1% but that it would conduct more open market purchases of Exchange-traded funds. After cutting its bank rate by 25 basis points on 7 February, the Central Bank of Russia announced that it would keep its bank rate at 6%, while the Bank of Korea announced that it would cut its overnight rate by 50 basis points to 0.75%. The Central Bank of Chile cut its benchmark rate, while the Reserve Bank of New Zealand cut its official cash rate by 75 basis points to 0.25%. The Czech National Bank announced that it would cut its bank rate by 50 basis points to 1.75%.

== Impact by region or country ==
=== Africa ===
In April 2020, Sub-Saharan Africa appeared poised to enter its first recession in 25 years, but this time for a longer duration. The World Bank predicted that overall sub-Saharan Africa's economy would shrink by 2.1%–5.1% during 2020. African countries cumulatively owe $152 billion to China from loans taken 2000–2018; as of May 2020, China was considering granting deadline extensions for repayment, and in June 2020, Chinese leader Xi Jinping said that some interest-free loans to certain countries would be forgiven.

==== Botswana ====
Botswana has been affected by sharp falls in the diamond trade, tourism and other sectors.

==== Egypt ====
The Economy of Egypt suffered from the COVID-19 recession. Tourism, which employs one in ten Egyptians and contributes about 5% of the GDP, has largely stopped, while remittances from migrant workers abroad (9% of GDP) are also expected to fall. The cheap fuel prices and slower demand also led some shipping companies to avoid the Suez Canal, and instead opt for traveling by the Cape of Good Hope, leading to reduced transit fees for the government. However, despite this, Egypt were one of the few African countries to have a positive growth rate during the recession.

==== Ethiopia ====
Ethiopia is heavily dependent for export income on its national carrier, Ethiopian Airlines, which has announced suspensions on 80 flight routes. Exports of flowers and other agricultural products dropped sharply.

==== Namibia ====
Namibia's central bank sees the nation's economy shrinking by 6.9% This will be the biggest shrink of GDP since its independence in 1990. The tourism and hospitality industries has accounted for N$26 billion being lost as 125,000 jobs were affected. The central bank also announced that the diamond-mining sector will decline by 14.9% in 2020, while uranium mining may shrink 22%.

==== Zambia ====
Zambia faced a severe debt crisis. Almost half the national budget goes towards interest payments, with questions about whether the country will be able to make all future payments.

=== Americas ===
==== Argentina ====
Argentina entered its 9th sovereign default in history due to the recession. The government has proposed taking over one of the largest agroexporting companies Vicentín S.A.I.C after it incurred in a debt of more than $1.35 billion.

==== Belize ====
The fall in travel was expected to drive Belize into a deep recession in 2020. In 2020, the economy contracted 13.4% with the sharpest declines observed in net foreign demand and private consumption. On an annualized base, the unemployment rate increased 19.1% from September 2019 to September 2020.

==== Brazil ====
The Brazilian government forecast that its economy will experience its biggest crash since 1900, with a gross domestic product contraction of 4.7%. At the first trimester of 2020 the gross domestic product was 1.5% smaller than the GDP of the first trimester of 2019, and it decreased to the same level of 2012. On 9 April 2020, at least 600,000 businesses went bankrupt, and 9 million people were fired.

Even with the pandemic, the state of São Paulo was the only Brazilian state to see a GDP growth in 2020, of about 0.4%.

==== Canada ====
Total unemployment increased by 3 million and total hours worked fell by 30% between February and April 2020. Canadian manufacturing sales in March fell to the lowest level since mid-2016, as sales by auto manufacturers and parts suppliers plunged more than 30%.

In response, the government of Canada introduced several benefits, including the Canada Emergency Response Benefit, the Canada Emergency Student Benefit, and the Canada Emergency Wage Subsidy.

By June 2020, the national unemployment rate in Canada was 12.5%, down from 13.7% in May.

==== Mexico ====
Mexico's outlook was already poor before the COVID-19 pandemic, with a mild recession in 2019. The economic development plans of president Andrés Manuel López Obrador were predicated on revenue from the state oil company Pemex, but the oil price collapse has now raised doubts on those plans. Beyond oil, the country's economy also relies on tourism, trade with the United States, as well as remittances, which all are also being affected. All of this leading to what could be Mexico's worst recession in a century, and the worst in Latin America after Venezuela. Beside this prediction, Mexico's economy shrinking in 2020 was less than that of Venezuela, Peru, Panama, Argentina and equal to that of Ecuador.

==== United States ====
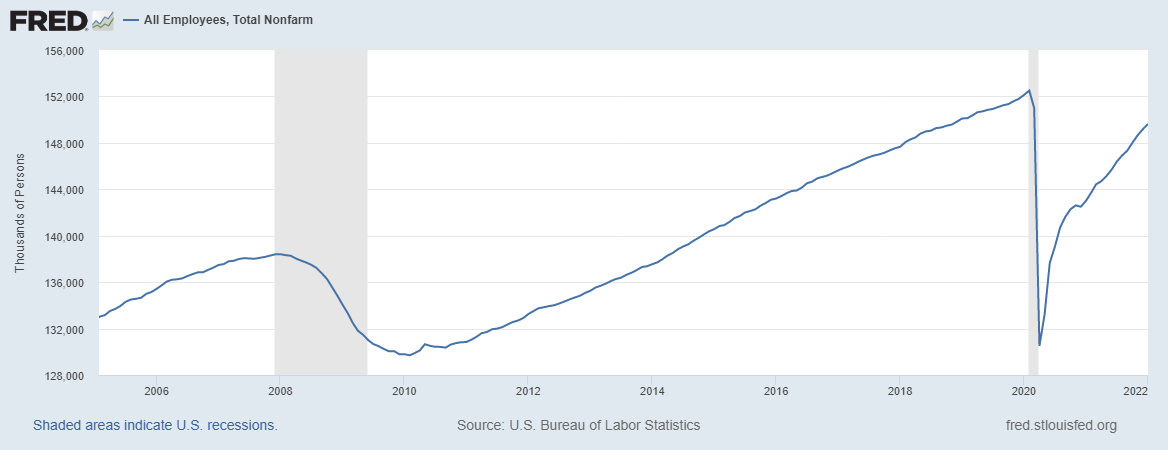
US non-farm payrolls, 2005 – January 2022

The National Bureau of Economic Research, considered the arbiter of recession declarations, found the United States recession began in February 2020 and ended roughly two months later, in April 2020, making it the shortest recession on records dating to 1854.

Before the pandemic, there were signs of recession. The US yield curve inverted in mid-2019, usually indicative of a forthcoming recession.

Starting in March 2020, job loss was rapid. About 16 million jobs were lost in the United States in the three weeks ending on 4 April. Unemployment claims reached a record high, with 3.3 million claims made in the week ending on 21 March. (The previous record had been 700,000 from 1982.) The week ending 28 March, however, unemployment claims set another record at 6.7 million and by 13 May, new claims had topped 35 million. On 8 May, the Bureau of Labor Statistics reported a U-3 unemployment (official unemployment) figure of 14.7%, the highest level recorded since 1941, with U-6 unemployment (total unemployed plus marginally attached and part-time underemployed workers) reaching 22.8%.

For individual states, the Bureau of Labor Statistics reported the highest U-3 unemployment occurred in April 2020 in Nevada (30.1%), Michigan (24.0%) and Hawaii (23.8%), levels not seen since the Great Depression. This was followed by Rhode Island in April (18.1%), Massachusetts in June (17.7%), and Ohio in April (17.6%). By December 2020, unemployment rates for the highest three states were recovering: Nevada (9.2%), Michigan (7.5%), and Hawaii (9.3%), with seven other states having recovered to below 4.0%. However, a high percentage of those gains may have been part-time work, job gains in May 2020 were reported to be 40% part-time.

Restaurant patronage fell sharply across the country, and major airlines reduced their operations on a large scale. The Big Three car manufacturers all halted production. In April, construction of new homes dropped by 30%, reaching the lowest level in five years.

Approximately 5.4 million Americans lost their health insurance from February to May 2020 after losing their jobs.

The St. Louis Fed Financial Stress Index increased sharply from below zero to 5.8 during March 2020. The United States Department of Commerce reported that consumer spending fell by 7.5 percent during the month of March 2020. It was the largest monthly drop since record keeping began in 1959. As a result, the country's gross domestic product reduced at a rate of 4.8 percent during the first quarter of 2020.

The largest economic stimulus legislation in American history, a $2 trillion (~$2.45 trillion in 2025) package called the CARES Act, was signed into law on 27 March 2020.

The Congressional Budget Office reported in May 2020 that:

- The unemployment rate increased from 3.5% in February to 14.7% in April, representing a decline of more than 25 million people employed, plus another 8 million persons that exited the labor force.
- Job declines were focused on industries that rely on "in-person interactions" such as retail, education, health services, leisure and hospitality. For example, 8 of the 17 million leisure and hospitality jobs were lost in March and April.
- The economic impact was expected to hit smaller and newer businesses harder, as they typically have less financial cushion.
- Real (inflation-adjusted) consumer spending fell 17% from February to April, as social distancing reached its peak. In April, car and light truck sales were 49% below the late 2019 monthly average. Mortgage applications fell 30% in April 2020 versus April 2019.
- Real GDP was forecast to fall at a nearly 38% annual rate in the second quarter, or 11.2% versus the prior quarter, with a return to positive quarter-to-quarter growth of 5.0% in Q3 and 2.5% in Q4 2020. However, real GDP was not expected to regain its Q4 2019 level until 2022 or later.
- The unemployment rate was forecast to average 11.5% in 2020 and 9.3% in 2021.

The COVID recession increased wealth and racial inequality. According to a study, the pandemic drove 8 million Americans into poverty between May and September 2020. On 30 July 2020, it was reported that the U.S. 2nd quarter gross domestic product fell at an annualized rate of 33%.

==== Latin America ====
The recession caused by COVID-19 is expected to be the worst in the history of Latin America. Latin American countries are expected to fall into a "lost decade", with Latin America's GDP returning to 2010 levels, falling by 9.1%. The amount by which the GDP is expected to fall per country is listed below.

| Country | GDP contraction |
|---|---|
| Venezuela | −26% |
| Peru | −13% |
| Brazil | −10.5% |
| Argentina | −9.2% |
| Ecuador | −9% |
| Mexico | −9% |
| El Salvador | −8.6% |
| Nicaragua | −8.3% |
| Cuba | −8% |
| Chile | −7.9% |
| Panama | −6.5% |
| Honduras | −6.1% |
| Colombia | −5.6% |
| Costa Rica | −5.5% |
| Dominican Republic | −5.3% |
| Bolivia | −5.2% |
| Uruguay | −5% |
| Guatemala | −4.1% |
| Paraguay | −2.3% |

Other sources may expect different figures. In Panama, COVID-19 is expected to subtract US$5.8 billion from Panama's GDP. Aiding Chile's downfall is reduced demand for copper from the US and China, and an increase in price volatility, as consequences of the COVID-19 pandemic.

=== Asia-Pacific ===
==== Australia ====
Australia before the recession was suffering from an unusually severe and expensive bushfire season which damaged the economy and domestic trade routes. Not only that, but Australia had experienced significant slowdown in their economic growth, with economists in late 2019 saying that Australia was 'teetering on the edge of a recession'. As a result of this and the effects of the recession, analysts in Australia expected a deep recession with at least 10.0% of the able working population becoming unemployed according to the Australian treasury and at least a 6.7% GDP retraction according to the IMF. In April 2020, a water consultant predicted a shortage of rice and other staples during the pandemic unless farmers' water allocations were changed.

The unemployment level of 5.1% was projected to rise to a 25-year high of 10.0%, according to Treasury data released in April 2020. The JobSeeker Payment unemployment benefit had an A$550 per fortnight Coronavirus Supplement added to it from April to September, when it reduced to A$250, then to A$150 after 31 December. The Supplement ceased on 31 March 2021.

By April 2020, up to a million people had been laid off due to effects of the recession. Over 280,000 individuals applied for unemployment support on the peak day.

On 23 July 2020, Treasurer Josh Frydenberg delivered a quarterly budget update stating the government had implemented a $289 billion (~$354 billion in 2025) economic support package. As a result, the 2020–21 budget will record a $184 billion (~$225 billion in 2025) deficit, the largest since WWII. Australia will maintain their triple A credit rating. Net debt will increase to $677.1 billion (~$793 billion in 2025) at 20 June 2021. Further, real GDP was forecast to have fallen sharply by 7% in the June quarter with unemployment anticipated to peak at 9.25% in the December quarter. However, due to the further reinstatement of restrictions on Victoria, notably stage 4 restrictions, national unemployment was expected to reach 11%.

In August 2020, national unemployment peaked at 7.5%, falling to 5.6% by April 2021. In December 2020, it was announced Australia had pulled out of recession after experiencing a 3.3% growth in GDP in the September quarter. Treasurer Frydenberg stated the effects of the recession had lasting impacts and recovery was far from over. Australia was set to avoid an economic depression as once forecast earlier that year, though GDP was still likely to have experienced a contraction from 2019 figures.

==== Bangladesh ====
Bangladesh is one of the few countries who had a generally positive gdp growth during the pandemic. The Bangladeshi economy is heavily dependent on the garment industry and remittances from migrant workers. The garment industry has been heavily affected, having already been contracting in 2019. Remittances in turn expected to fall 22 percent.

==== China ====
As a result of the recession, China's economy contracted for the first time in almost 50 years. The national GDP for the first quarter of 2020 dropped 6.8% year-on-year, 10.0% quarter on quarter, and the GDP for Hubei Province dropped 39.2% in the same period.

In May 2020, Chinese Premier Li Keqiang announced that, for the first time in history, the central government would not set an economic growth target for 2020, with the economy having contracted by 6.8% compared to 2019 and China facing an "unpredictable" time. However, the government also stated an intention to create 9 million new urban jobs until the end of 2020.

In October 2020, it was announced that China's third-quarter GDP had grown 4.9%, hereby missing analysts expectations (which was set at 5.2%). However, it does show that China's economy was steadily recovering from the coronavirus shock that caused decades-low growth. To fuel economic growth, the country set aside hundreds of billions of dollars for major infrastructure projects and used population tracking policies and enforced the stringent lockdown to contain the virus. It is the only major economy that is expected to grow in 2020, according to the International Monetary Fund.

By December 2020, China's economic recovery was accelerating amid increasing demand for manufactured goods. The UK-based Centre for Economics and Business Research projected that China's "skilful management of the pandemic" would cause the Chinese economy to surpass the United States and become the world's largest economy by nominal GDP in 2028, five years sooner than previously expected. China's economy expanded by 2.3% in 2020.

In the first quarter of 2020, China's economy shrank by 6.8% due to the nationwide lockdown at the peak of the COVID-19 outbreak. With the help of strict virus containment measures and emergency corporate relief, the economy has steadily recovered since the pandemic. China's economy grew by a record 18.3 percent in the first quarter of 2021 compared with the same period last year.

The urban unemployment rate reached a 21-month all-time high of 6.1% in April 2022 amid the impact of the epidemic.

==== Korea ====
Korea's gross domestic product (GDP) growth rate in the second quarter of 2020 fell 3.3 percent from the previous quarter. This is the second consecutive quarter of negative growth following the first quarter (−1.3 percent). It was the lowest performance in 22 years and three months since the first quarter of 1998 (−6.8 percent) after the 1997 Asian financial crisis. Experts cited exports, which account for 40 percent of the Korean economy, as the worst performance report in 57 years since 1963, as the main factor for negative growth.

The employment market situation is also a big blow. According to the National Statistical Office, the number of employed people decreased by more than 350,000 in June from a year earlier due to the shock of the job market caused by the spread of COVID-19. The unemployment rate soared to the highest since 1999 when the statistics began to be compiled. In particular, the number of economically active young people decreased a lot, and the number of unemployed reached 1.66 million, up 120,000 from a year earlier.

The Korean economy exhibited relatively low real GDP growth prior to the spread of the virus caused by COVID-19 (1%). The already sluggish economy led Korea to experience a contraction of its real GDP during the first half of 2020, with a decline of 1.28% in the first quarter and a contraction of 2.74% in the second quarter, indicating a recession. After reaching a trough in the second quarter, the economy began to recover, showing an expansion of 2.2% in the third quarter. The year ended with a growth of 1.6% in the fourth quarter, which remained relatively stable at 1.5% during the first quarter of 2021. Even though recessions are often accompanied by unemployment the Korean labor market showed low fluctuations during and after the recession as moderately higher levels of unemployment lagged behind economic activity. By the end of the second quarter of 2020, the unemployment rate has increase by less than a percentage point compare to October 2019 (3.5%) to 4.2%. This relatively stable trend in the labor market continued through the third and fourth quarter, with unemployment peaking at 4.8% in January 2021. Changes in the business cycle in Korea during the Covid recession reinforced the near zero inflation rates observed the last quarter of 2019, consistent with the slow economic growth at the onset of the recession. This low inflation persisted during the first quarter of 2020 and in the second quarter, the economy experienced a minor deflation, with a negative inflation rate of 0.21%, likely due to the continuous deflation in energy prices. In the first quarter of 2020, the energy inflation huber around −7.8% during the first two months, but it fell to −10.22% in May.

==== Fiji ====
On 18 March, the Reserve Bank of Fiji reduced its overnight policy rate (OPR) (Note: The OPR is the key interest rate used by the Reserve Bank of Fiji (RBF) to officially indicate and communicate its monetary policy stance. A reduction in the OPR signifies an easing of monetary policy.) and predicted the domestic economy to fall into a recession after decades of economic growth. Later on 25 June, the national bank predicted the Fijian economy to contract severely this year due to falling consumption and investment associated with ongoing job-losses. Annual inflation remained in negative territory in May (−1.7%) and is forecast to edge up to 1.0 percent by year-end.

==== India ====
The IMF predicted the growth rate of India in the financial year of 2020–21 as 1.9%, but in the following financial year, they predict it to be 7.4%. IMF also predicted that India and China are the only two major economies that will maintain positive growth rates. However the prediction later turned out to be wrong.

On 24 June 2020, IMF revised India's growth rate to −4.5%, a historic low. However, IMF said India's economy is expected to bounce back in 2021 with a robust six percent growth rate.

On 31 August 2020, the National Statistical Office (NSO) released the data, which revealed that the country's GDP contracted by 23.9 per cent in the first quarter of 2020–21 financial year. The economic contraction followed the severe lockdown to contain the COVID-19 pandemic, where an estimated 140 million jobs were lost. According to the Organization for Economic Co-operation and Development, it was the worst fall in history.

==== Indonesia ====
In the last quarter of 2019, around the time when concerns for the upcoming coronavirus pandemic were coming to light, the Indonesian economy was shown to be already weakened. For example, the year 2019 ended with only an increase of 1.1% in GDP for Indonesia within the last quarter. The early months following 2020 were when the coronavirus pandemic truly started to affect countries around the globe. Indonesia's economy was no different, immediately showing evidence of undergoing a recession during the first half of the year. The economy's GDP dropped by 0.6% in 2020's first quarter and hit a trough at 6.9% contraction during the second quarter. While the contraction was a big hit to the economy, compared to the massive contractions other countries faced during COVID-19. Indonesia was still doing quite well. During the third quarter, Indonesia's economy seemed to recover slightly, experiencing a 3.3% expansion of real GDP. The last quarter of 2020 remained not that impressive, with the GDP increasing by 2.2%. These slight expansions in Indonesia's economy are quite low, and it is evident that the economy continued to remain weak after the initial major hit of the global pandemic. Across the end of 2019 and the year 2020, the inflation rate that Indonesia's economy experienced remained quite low and consistent. Noticeably, the Inflation rate during the last quarter of 2019 and the first half of 2020 had the largest increase, consisting of around a 2.7% increase on the low end with a 3.1% at the high end. However, for the rest of the months that followed, inflation remained at around 1% and 1.7% for the rest of 2020; following the consistency of low and non-dramatic GDP that Indonesia experienced.

==== Iraq ====
As 90% of the government income comes from oil, it will be extremely heavily hit by the drop in prices.

The employment market has also taken a huge hit. The excessive dependence on oil exposes the country to macroeconomic volatility. As of January 2021, Iraq's unemployment rate was more than 10 percentage points higher than its pre-COVID-19 level of 12.7%.

==== Japan ====
In Japan, the 2019 4th quarter GDP shrank 7.1% from the previous quarter due to two main factors. One is the government's raise in consumption tax from 8% to 10% despite opposition from the citizens. The other is the devastating effects of Typhoon Hagibis, the strongest typhoon in decades to strike mainland Japan. It was the costliest Pacific typhoon on record. Japanese exports to South Korea were also negatively affected by the Japan–South Korea trade dispute, lowering aggregate demand and GDP growth. This all adds to the effect of the pandemic on people's lives and the economy, the prime minister unveiling a 'massive" stimulus amounting to 20% of GDP.

==== Lebanon ====
Since August 2019, Lebanon had been experiencing a major economic crisis that was caused by an increase in the official exchange rate between the Lebanese pound and the United States dollar. This was further escalated by a large explosion in Beirut, which delivered critical damage to the Port of Beirut, harming Lebanese trade, and protests throughout the country.

==== Malaysia ====
The COVID-19 pandemic in Malaysia has had a significant impact on the Malaysian economy, leading to the devaluation of the Malaysian ringgit (MYR) and the decline in the country's gross domestic product. The pandemic also adversely affected several key sectors including entertainment, markets, retail, hospitality, and tourism. Besides shortages in goods and services, many businesses had to cope with social distancing and lockdown restrictions, which affected their operations and revenue. The pandemic also drew attention to workplace safety and the exploitation of migrant workers working in Malaysian industries.

==== Nepal ====
As millions of Nepalis work outside of the country, at least hundreds of thousands are expected to return due to layoffs abroad, in what has been labelled a "crisis" that may "overwhelm the Nepali state".

==== New Zealand ====
In April 2020, the New Zealand Treasury projected that the country could experience an unemployment rate of 13.5 percent if the country remained in lockdown for four weeks, with a range of 17.5 and 26 percent if the lockdown was extended. Prior to the lockdown, the unemployment rate was at 4.2%. Finance Minister Grant Robertson vowed that the Government would keep the unemployment rate below 10%. In the second quarter of 2020, unemployment fell 0.2 percentage points to 4 percent; however, the under-use rate (a measure of spare capacity in the labor market) rose to a record 12 percent, up 1.6 percentage points from the previous quarter, and working hours fell by 10 percent.

The GDP of New Zealand contracted 1.6 percent in the first quarter of 2020. The country officially entered a recession after a GDP contraction of 12.2% in the second quarter of 2020 which was reported by Statistics New Zealand in September.

==== Philippines ====
The Philippines' real GDP contracted by 0.2% in the first quarter of 2020, the first contraction since the fourth quarter of 1998, a year after the 1997 Asian financial crisis. The economy slipped in technical recession after a 16.5% decline was recorded in the second quarter.

The government projects that the GDP will contract by 5.5% in 2020. The First Metro Investment Corp projects a year-on-year GDP decline of 8–9%. The decline is led by a decrease in household spending which typically accounts for 70% of the country's GDP and hesitancy on spending due to COVID-19 community quarantine measures.

In its annual economic performance report released on 28 January 2021, the Philippine Statistics Authority reported that the Philippines' GDP contracted by 9.5% in 2020, its worst contraction since World War II. The last full-year contraction was during the 1997 Asian financial crisis where the GDP grew by −0.5%. The 2020 contraction was also worse than the 7% contraction in 1984.

==== Singapore ====
Property investment sales in Singapore fell 37 per cent to $3.02 billion in the first quarter of this year from the previous three months as the pandemic took its toll on investor sentiment, a report from Cushman & Wakefield on 13 April showed.

On 28 April, the Monetary Authority of Singapore (MAS) said in its latest half-yearly macroeconomic review Singapore will enter into a recession this year because of the blow from the COVID-19 pandemic, resulting in job losses and lower wages, with "significant uncertainty" over how long and intense the downturn will be. Depending on how the pandemic evolves and the efficacy of policy responses around the world, Singapore's economic growth could even dip below the forecast range of minus four to minus one per cent to record its worst-ever contraction.

On 29 April, the Ministry of Manpower (MOM) said that total employment excluding foreign domestic workers dropped by 19,900 in the first three months of the year, mainly due to a significant reduction in foreign employment. Among Singapore citizens, the unemployment rate increased from 3.3 per cent to 3.5 per cent, while the resident unemployment rate, which includes permanent residents, increased from 3.2 per cent to 3.3 per cent.

On 14 May, Singapore Airlines (SIA) posted its first annual net loss in 48 years – a net loss of S$732.4 million in the fourth quarter, reversing from a net profit of S$202.6 million in the corresponding quarter a year ago.

=== Europe ===
The European Purchasing Managers' Index, a key indicator of economic activity, crashed to a record-low of 13.5 in April 2020. Normally, any figure below 50 is a sign of economic decline.

==== Armenia ====
The Armenian economy shrank sharply by 7.6%, erasing all the gains from 2019.

==== Belarus ====
The Belarusian economy is being negatively affected by the loss of Russian oil subsidies, and the drop in price of Belarus's refined oil products.

==== Belgium ====
The Belgian economy exhibited low real GDP growth prior to the onset of the public health crisis caused by the coronavirus pandemic. An already weakened economy, Belgium experienced a contraction of its real GDP during the first half of 2020 with a decline of 2.8% in the first quarter and an 11.4% contraction in the second quarter, suggesting a recession. After a trough in the second quarter, the economy bounced back and experience an 11.8% expansion of its real GDP (insert OECD GDP link using the reference button). That recovery was followed by a minor contraction of 0.4% in the fourth quarter of 2020 and a recovery the first quarter of 2021 with an economic expansion of about 2%. Despite the instability of Belgium's GDP in 2020, the labor market showed resilience avoiding a more significant decline as observed in other countries at the time. The unemployment rate in Belgium remained relatively steady during the first quarter of 2020 compared to the previous quarter and it only increased by about a percentage point in April 2024 compared to the 5.2% unemployment in October 2019. The business cycle fluctuations of the Belgian economy did not bring significant changes to inflation rates which remained rather low since the end of 2019 and through 2020.

==== Czechia ====
Czechia was very well established economically when heading into the late 2019 year and the early 2020 year. During the fourth quarter of 2019, their real GDP saw a small increase of 0.7% compared to the last quarter. Then like most countries, they hit the wall in the early quarters of 2020 with a decrease of 3.5% during the first quarter and a significantly larger decrease of 8.7% in the second quarter. After that difficult first half of the year, Czechia bounced back hard with a large increase of 7.4% in quarter three. Finally, as the year came to a close, they increased slightly by 1% heading into the 2021 year. In opposition to the real GDP percentage, the unemployment rate didn't vary too far from their average. In the fourth quarter of 2019, Czechia had an unemployment rate of 2.1%. With the events in 2020, Czechia managed to keep their unemployment rate even lower, with a percentage of 1.9%, in quarter one. Consequently, in the second quarter, there was an increase of 0.5% in the unemployment rate making it a 2.4% unemployment rate in the country. Just like in quarter two, we saw another increase of 0.4% during the quarter 3 with a total unemployment rate of 2.8%. Then to finish the year there was another slight increase, to 3.0% of unemployed people in Czechia. Thirdly, looking at Czechia's CPI to see the inflation/deflation of the country during this period. In the final quarter of 2019, Czechia experienced a CPI of 107.3, going into the new year. Czechia started the year with a CPI of 108.13 which is an increase from the year before meaning Czechia is facing slight inflation. In the second quarter, Czechia experienced a big deflation with a total CPI of 103.9, showing how quickly prices can change. In the third quarter, prices rose, yet again, with their CPI totaling 105.3. To finish off the year they went back to deflating with a total CPI of 103.5, their lowest of the year.

==== Denmark ====
The Danish economy experienced low GDP growth before the coronavirus outbreak in 2020. The Danish economy contracted in quarter 1 of 2020 as the GDP growth transitioned from 0.4% in quarter 4 of 2019 to −0.8% in quarter 1 of 2020 due to the deadly pandemic. Following the dip in GDP in quarter 1 of 2020, another decline came in quarter 2 as it went from −0.8% to −5.9% which resulted in a deep recession. The recessionary period in 2020 did not last long as the GDP growth skyrocketed from −5.9% in quarter 2 to 6.0% in quarter 3. Though Denmark's economy did manage to make it out of the recession, the rapid growth resulted in an expansion in quarter 3 of 2020 increasing inflation. In quarter 4 of 2020, the economy contracted from 6.0% to 0.0% dropping inflation slightly. The GDP of Denmark did rise somewhat in quarter 1 of 2021 to 0.9%. Denmark experienced low inflation from 2019 to 2021, reaching a point where the economy experienced an inflation rate of 0% during the peak of the pandemic. This, in turn, caused deflation in the second quarter of 2020. Denmark experienced a moderate to high unemployment rate. As of quarter 4 of 2019, it went from an unemployment rate of 5% to an unemployment rate of 6.4% in quarter 1 of 2021. The GDP, unemployment rate, and inflation rate mirrors the fluctuating economy of Denmark displayed during the start, middle and end of the pandemic.

==== France ====
France has been hit hard by the pandemic, with two months of 'strict lockdown' imposed before mid-year. On 8 April 2020, the Bank of France declared that the French economy was in recession, shrinking by 6 percent in the first quarter of 2020.

At the end of the second trimester of 2020, several companies began staff cuts: Nokia (1233 jobs), Renault (4600 jobs), Air France (7580 jobs), Airbus (5000 jobs), Derichebourg (700 jobs), TUI France (583 jobs) and NextRadio TV (330–380 jobs).

==== Italy ====
Italy's unemployment rate is expected to rise to 11.2%, with 51% fearing unemployment in March.

The preliminary estimate of 1Q20 Italian GDP showed a 4.7% quarter on quarter fall (−4.8% YoY), a much steeper decline than in any quarter either during the Great Recession or the European debt crisis.

==== Luxembourg ====
The Luxembourg economy exhibited low real GDP growth prior to the onset of the public health crisis caused by the coronavirus pandemic. An already weakened economy, Luxembourg experienced a contraction of its real GDP during the first half of 2020 with a decline of 1.2% in the first quarter and a 6.2% contraction in the second quarter, suggesting a recession. After a trough in the second quarter, the economy bounced back and experienced an 8.4% expansion of its real GDP in the third quarter. That recovery was followed by a minor contraction of 0.5% in the fourth quarter of 2020. Despite the instability of Luxembourg's GDP in 2020, the labor market showed resilience, avoiding a more significant deterioration as observed in other countries at the time. The unemployment rate in Luxembourg remained relatively steady during the first quarter of 2020 compared to the previous quarter and increased only slightly by about 0.4 percentage points in April 2020 compared to the 5.6% unemployment in October 2019. Subsequently to the contraction of GDP in the first quarter of 2020, the unemployment rate peaked at 7.5% in the second quarter, then decreased to 6.8% in the third quarter and 6.3% at the end of the year.

The business cycle fluctuations of the Luxembourg economy did not bring significant changes to inflation rates, which remained rather low since the end of 2019 and through 2020.[363]

==== Spain ====
The COVID-19 pandemic caused major disruptions to Spain's economy, leading to significant downturns in key sectors. GDP shrank by −5.38% in Q1 2020 and −17.64% in Q2 2020, before partially rebounding with +16.24% in Q3 2020 as restrictions eased. Growth slowed again to +0.24% in Q4 2020 and +0.40% in Q1 2021, signaling a gradual stabilization. Exports saw sharp declines, dropping −7.35% in Q1 2020 and −30.90% in Q2 2020, but recovered with +27.54% in Q3 2020, +4.89% in Q4 2020, and +0.73% in Q1 2021. Imports mirrored this pattern, falling by −4.35% in Q1 2020 and −28.23% in Q2 2020, followed by rebounds of +26.88% in Q3 2020, +5.99% in Q4 2020, and +2.60% in Q1 2021. Household consumption was highly volatile, contracting by −6.08% in Q1 2020 and −21.39% in Q2 2020, then bouncing back with +21.37% in Q3 2020, only to slightly increase by +0.23% in Q4 2020 and decrease again by −0.23% in Q1 2021. Investment in fixed capital dropped by −2.40% in Q1 2020 and −19.45% in Q2 2020, before recovering with +19.54% in Q3 2020, though it saw small declines in Q4 2020 (−0.17%) and Q1 2021 (−0.15%). Government consumption remained more stable, steadily growing by +1.12% in Q1 2020, +0.95% in Q2 2020, +1.48% in Q3 2020, +1.78% in Q4 2020, and +0.66% in Q1 2021. These fluctuations underscore the pandemic's deep and uneven impact on the economy, marked by sharp contractions followed by partial recoveries and ongoing volatility. Unemployment was rampant during these six-quarters as Spain's internal economy suffered.

==== Switzerland ====
The Swiss economy showed modest real GDP growth in the final quarter of 2019, with a growth rate of 0.55%. However, the onset of the COVID-19 pandemic led to a significant contraction of 1.4% in the first quarter of 2020, followed by a steep 6.6% decline in the second quarter, suggesting the start of a recession. The economy rebounded in the third quarter of 2020 with a sharp 6.9% expansion, but growth slowed down in the fourth quarter to just 0.4%. In the first quarter of 2021, the economy grew by 0.3%. Despite the fluctuations in GDP, inflation remained subdued during this period. Annual inflation in Switzerland was negative in every month from October 2019 to March 2021, with the lowest rate recorded in December 2020 at −0.81%. The inflation rate was slightly less negative in early 2020, with a small positive change of 0.2% in January 2020, before dipping further in the months following. Throughout this period, inflation remained low, signaling weak price pressures despite the economic challenges. Regarding unemployment, Switzerland saw a moderate rise in its unemployment rate during the pandemic. The unemployment rate remained relatively stable through early 2020, but by the end of the year, it increased from 4.4% in February 2020 to 5.1% in December 2020, reflecting the economic challenges posed by the crisis. The unemployment rate remained around 5% throughout much of 2021 before gradually decreasing to 4.4% by the end of 2021.

==== United Kingdom ====
On 19 March 2020 the Bank of England cut the interest rate to a historic low of 0.1%. Quantitative easing was extended by £200 billion to a total of £645 billion since the start of the Great Recession. A day later, the Chancellor of the Exchequer Rishi Sunak announced the government would spend £350 billion to bolster the economy. On 24 March non-essential business and travel were officially banned in the UK to limit the spread of SARS-CoV-2. In April the Bank agreed to extend the government's overdraft facility from £370 million to an undisclosed amount for the first time since 2008. Household spending fell 41.2% in April 2020 compared with April 2019. April's Purchasing Managers' Index score was 13.8 points, the lowest since records began in 1996, indicating a severe downturn of business activity.

By the start of May, 23% of the British workforce had been furloughed (temporarily laid off). Government schemes were launched to help furloughed employees and self-employed workers whose incomes had been affected by the outbreak, effectively paying 80% of their regular incomes, subject to eligibility. The Bank estimated that the UK economy could shrink 30% in the first half of 2020 and that unemployment was likely to rise to 9% in 2021. Economic growth was already weak before the COVID-19 pandemic, with 0% growth in the fourth quarter of 2019. On 13 May, the Office for National Statistics announced a 2% fall in GDP in the first quarter of 2020, including a then-record 5.8% monthly fall in March. The Chancellor warned it was very likely the UK was going through a significant recession.

HSBC, which is based in London, reported $4.3 billion (~$5.26 billion in 2025) in pre-tax profits during the first half of 2020; this was only one-third of the profits it had taken in the first half of the previous year.

On 12 August, it was announced that the UK had entered into recession for the first time in 11 years.

During the pandemic, exports of many food and drink products from the UK declined significantly, partly because the hospitality industry worldwide experienced a major slump. According to news reports in February 2021, the Scotch whisky sector alone had experienced £1.1 billion in lost sales.

Tourism in the UK (by visitors from both the UK and from other countries) declined substantially due to travel restrictions and lockdowns. For much of 2020, and into 2021, vacation travel was not permitted and entry into the UK was very strictly limited. Business travel, for example, declined by nearly 90% over previous years. This not only affected revenue from tourism but also led to numerous job losses.

=== Middle East ===
In the Middle East, the economic situation in the United Arab Emirates and Saudi Arabia deteriorated more than any other country in the region. Relying highly on tourism, Dubai was one of the first to reopen tourism. However, by January 2021, a significant surge in Covid cases in the UAE was observed, while several countries across the world also began to blame the Emirati city for spreading the virus abroad.

On the other hand, the economy of the world's largest oil exporter, Saudi Arabia, faced a deep recession, due to the COVID-19 pandemic. In the second quarter, Saudi's economy shrank by 7 per cent, hitting both the oil and non-oil sectors. Besides, unemployment during the quarter also hit a record high of 15.4 per cent. For the third quarter, the Kingdom didn't release its labor market report for the assessment of the unemployment rate. In January 2021, it was reported that Saudi was supposed to release the data on citizen unemployment in December 2020. However, it was delayed four times, before the officials permanently removed the release date from the Saudi statistics authority's website.

==== Saudi Arabia ====
The Saudi economy was severely challenged from 2019 to 2020, and the global COVID-19 pandemic further exacerbated its effects on major economic indicators. Unemployment in Saudi Arabia increased during this period. The unemployment rate in 2019 Q3 was around 12% for Saudi nationals, which went up to 15.4% in the second quarter of 2020. The pandemic, together with economic slowdowns especially in tourism, hospitality, and retail, brought about job losses, particularly among the younger generation of workers. In November 2019 Saudi Arabia inflation rate was −0.8%. Then in November 2020 the inflation rate increased to 5.7%. During the pandemic the inflation grew about 4.9%. The country contracted by not producing and selling oil and products that people did not want to use during the pandemic. Saudi Arabia GDP for 2020 was $734.27B, a 12.44% decline from 2019 which was $838.56B. GDP growth rate in 2019 Q4 was 0.9% and in 2020 Q4 the GDP grew to 1.5% which is an expansion to the economy GDP. Overall, the Saudi Arabian economy had a turbulent year, with high unemployment, and significant GDP contraction amidst the global health crisis.

== Impact by sector ==
Various service sectors have been hit particularly hard by the COVID-19 recession.

=== Automotive industry ===
New vehicle sales in the United States have declined by 40%. The American Big Three have all shut down their US factories. The Automotive industry in Germany suffered after having already suffered from the Volkswagen emissions scandal, as well as competition from electric cars.

=== Energy ===
Oil tankers sit off the coast of Southern California, 23 April 2020.

The demand shock to oil was so severe that the price of American oil futures contracts became negative (bottoming out at $-37.63 per barrel on the West Texas Intermediate), as traders started paying for buyers to take the product before storage capacity ran out. This was despite an earlier OPEC+ deal which cut world production by 10% and ended the 2020 Russia–Saudi Arabia oil price war.

=== Tourism ===
The global tourism industry may shrink up to 50% due to the pandemic.

=== Restaurants ===
The COVID-19 pandemic has impacted the restaurant business. In the beginning of March 2020, some major cities in the US announced that bars and restaurants would be closed to sit-down diners and limited to takeout orders and delivery. Some employees were fired, and more employees lacked sick leave in the sector compared to similar sectors.

=== Retail ===
Shopping centers and other retailers around the world have reduced hours or closed down entirely. Many were expected not to recover, thereby accelerating the effects of the retail apocalypse. Department stores and clothing shops have been especially hit.

=== Transportation ===
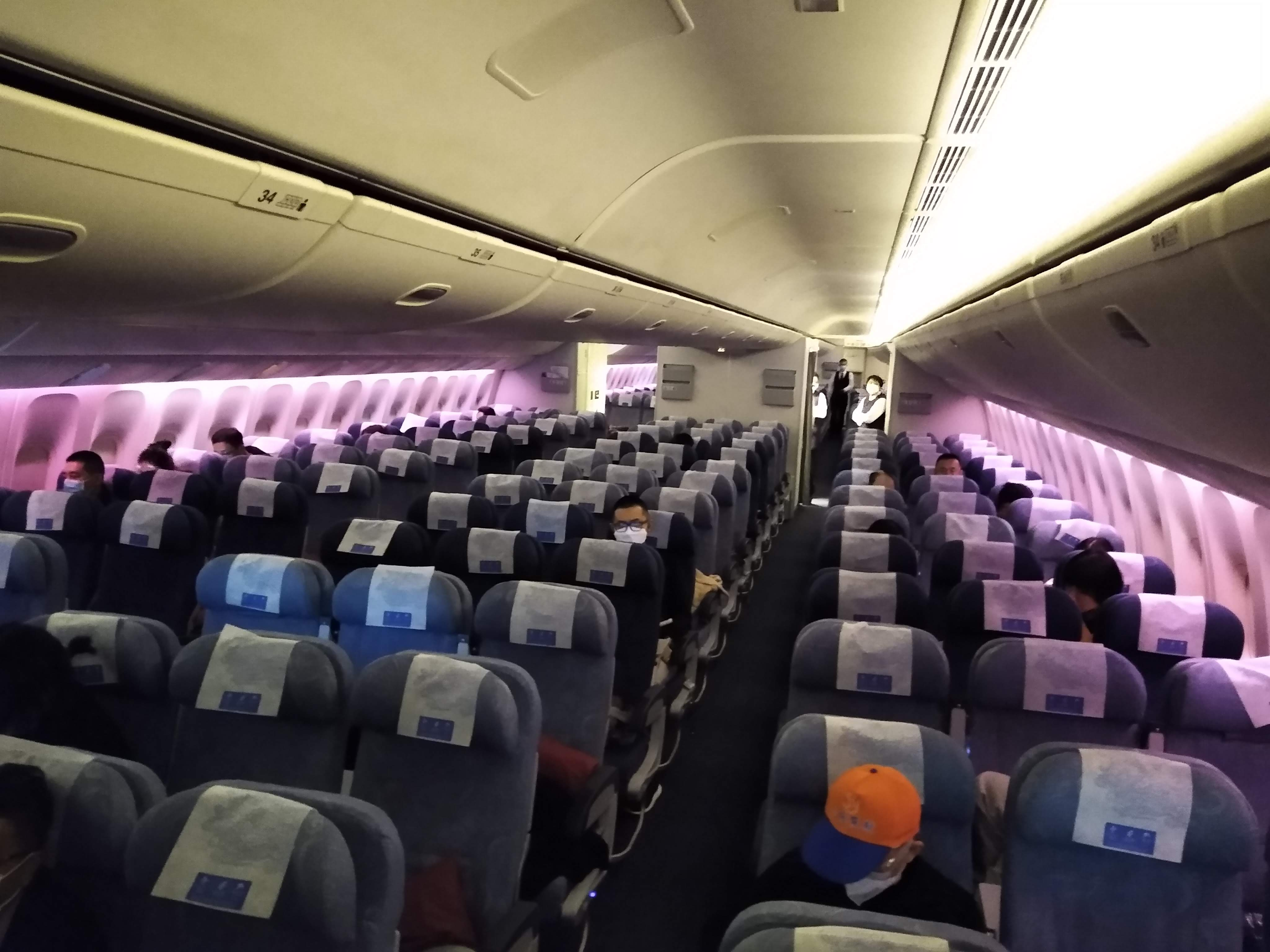
A nearly empty flight from Beijing to Los Angeles during the pandemic

The pandemic has had a significant impact on the aviation industry due to the resulting travel restrictions as well as slump in demand among travelers. Significant reductions in passenger numbers have resulted in planes flying empty between airports and the cancellation of flights.

The following airlines have gone bankrupt or into administration:

- Compass Airlines
- Flybe
- Trans States Airlines
- Virgin Australia
- Air Mauritius
- Alitalia
- Avianca
- LATAM
- South African Airways
- Montenegro Airlines

The cruise ship industry has also been heavily affected by a downturn, with the share prices of the major cruise lines down 70–80%.

=== U.S. impact by occupation and demographic ===
Differences across occupations caused difference in the economic effects across groups. Certain jobs were less suitable for remote work, e.g. because they involve working with people closely or with particular materials. Women tended to be affected more than men. The employment of immigrants in the U.S. declined more than for the native-born partly because the kinds of job immigrants held. Inequity in economic impact on workers in similar professions occurred when employees laid-off completely were awarded both State unemployment benefits and up to $600/week in federal pandemic assistance – which together could equal or exceed pre-layoff income – while peers reduced to part-time employment struggled, ineligible for either unemployment insurance compensation or the accompanying pandemic payments.

== Food insecurity ==
Unlike the Great Recession, it is expected that the COVID-19 recession will also affect the majority of developing nations. On 21 April, the United Nations World Food Programme warned that a famine "of biblical proportions" was expected in several parts of the world as a result of the pandemic. The release of 2020 Global Report on Food Crises indicated that 55 countries were at risk, with David Beasley estimating that in a worst-case scenario "about three dozen" countries would succumb to famine. This is particularly an issue in several countries affected by war, including the Yemeni Civil War, the Syrian civil war, insurgency in the Maghreb and the Afghanistan Conflict and occurs on a background of the 2019 locust infestations in East Africa. Nestlé, PepsiCo, the United Nations Foundation and farmers' unions have written to the G20 for support in maintaining food distributions to prevent food shortages. It is estimated that double the number of people "will go hungry" when compared to pre-pandemic levels.

The United Nations forecasts that the following member states will have significant areas with poor food security categorised as under "stress" (IPC phase 2), "crisis" (IPC phase 3), "emergency" (IPC phase 4) or "critical emergency" (IPC phase 5) in 2020:

- Afghanistan
- Angola
- Burkina Faso
- Cabo Verde
- Cameroon
- CAR
- Chad
- Cote d'Ivoire
- DR Congo
- El Salvador
- Eswatini
- Ethiopia
- Gambia
- Guatemala
- Guinea
- Guinea-Bissau
- Haiti
- Honduras
- Iraq
- Kenya
- Lesotho
- Liberia
- Libya
- Madagascar
- Malawi
- Mali
- Mauritania
- Mozambique
- Myanmar
- Namibia
- Nicaragua
- Niger
- Nigeria
- Pakistan
- Philippines
- Rwanda
- Senegal
- Sierra Leone
- Somalia
- South Sudan
- Sudan
- Syria
- Uganda
- Tanzania
- Venezuela
- Yemen
- Zambia
- Zimbabwe

It also raises alerts around:

- Bangladesh, in Cox's Bazar
- Colombia, among Venezuelan refugee crisis
- Djibouti
- Ecuador, among Venezuelan refugee crisis
- Lebanon, among Refugees of the Syrian civil war
- Palestine
- Turkey, among Refugees of the Syrian civil war
- Ukraine, in the Luhansk and Donetsk oblasts:
  - Donetsk People's Republic (not recognised by the UN)
  - Luhansk People's Republic (not recognised by the UN)

On 9 July, Oxfam released a report warning that "12,000 people per day could die from COVID-19 linked hunger" by 2021, estimating an additional 125 million people are at risk of starvation due to the pandemic. In particular the report highlighted "emerging epicentres" of hunger, alongside famine-stricken areas, including areas in Brazil, India, Yemen and the Sahel.

== National fiscal responses ==
Several countries have announced stimulus programs to counter the effects of the recession. Below is a summary table based on data from the International Monetary Fund (unless otherwise specified).

| Country | Direct spending (billions US$) | Direct spending (% GDP) | Loan guarantees and asset purchases (billions US$) | Notes | Additional sources |
|---|---|---|---|---|---|
| Australia | 139 | 9.7 | 125 | | |
| Austria | 43 | 9 | | | |
| Azerbaijan | 1.9 | 4.1 | | | |
| Bahrain | 1.5 | 4.2 | 9.8 | | |
| Belgium | 11.4 | 2.3 | 51.9 | | |
| Canada | 145 | 8.4 | 170 | | |
| Chile | 11.75 | 4.7 | | | |
| China | 380 | 2.5 | 770 | | |
| Cyprus | 1.00 | 4.3 | | | |
| Czech Republic | 4 | 2 | 40 | | |
| Denmark | 9 | 2.5 | | Another 2.5% is estimated to come from automatic stabilizers. | |
| Egypt | 6.13 | 1.8 | | | |
| Estonia | 2 | 7 | | | |
| European Union | 600 | 4 | 870 | Not including individual action by states. Further information: Next Generation EU | |
| France | 129 | 5 | 300 | | |
| Germany | 175 | 4.9 | 825 | States have announced additional spending. | |
| Greece | 27 | 14 | | | |
| Hong Kong | 36.69 | 10 | | | |
| India | 267 | 9 | | | |
| Iran | 55 | 10+ | | | |
| Ireland | 14.9 | 4 | | | |
| Israel | 26 | 7.2 | 10 | | |
| Italy | 90 | 3.1 | 400 | | |
| Japan | 1,070 | 21.1 | 15 | | |
| Kazakhstan | 13 | 9 | | | |
| Luxembourg | 3.5 | 4.9 | | | |
| Macao | 6.6 | 12.1 | | | |
| Malaysia | 7.5 | 2.1 | 10 | | |
| New Zealand | 40.9 | 21 | | | |
| Norway | 18 | 5.5 | | | |
| Pakistan | 8.8 | 3.8 | | Provincial governments have also announced fiscal measures | |
| Peru | 20 | 8 | | announced expenditure of 12% from total GDP | |
| Philippines | 21.45 | 5.83 | | | |
| Qatar | 20.6 | 13 | | | |
| Russia | 72.7 | 4.3 | | Total of the recovery plan in 2020–2021. | |
| Serbia | 3.35 | 6.5 | | Assistance in total amounts to about 5.7 billions USD (11% of the total GDP) | |
| Korea | 14 | 0.6 | 90 | | |
| Singapore | 54.5 | 11 | | | |
| Switzerland | 73 | 10.4 | | | |
| Thailand | 480 | 9.6 | | | |
| Turkey | 20 | 2 | | | |
| United Arab Emirates | 7.22 | 2 | | Targeted Economic Support Scheme (TESS) stimulus package | |
| United Kingdom | 360 | 10.6 | | | |
| United States | 2,900 | 14.5 | 4000 | | |

== See also ==
- 2020s in economic history
- Economic impact of the COVID-19 pandemic
- Financial market impact of the COVID-19 pandemic
- Green recovery
- Impact of the COVID-19 pandemic on the environment § Investments and other economic measures
- Lists of recessions
