= List of countries by diamond exports =

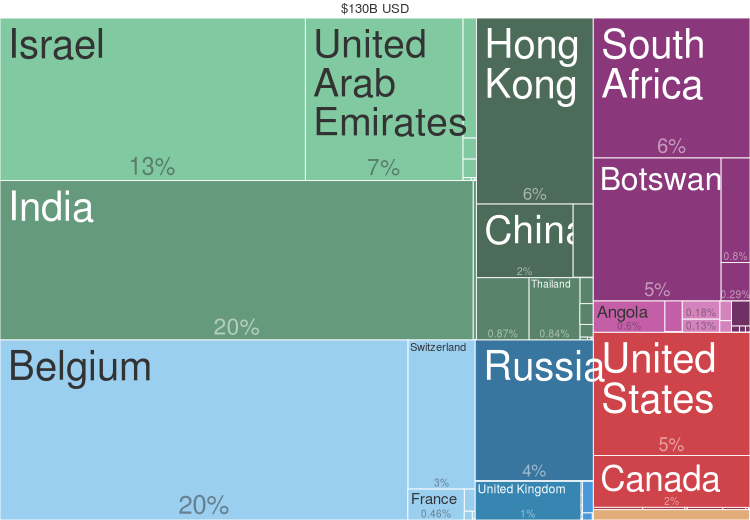
Diamonds countries export treemap (2014)

The following is a list of countries and territories by diamond exports.

== International Trade Centre ==
Data is for 2024, in thousands of United States dollars and carats.

List of countries by diamond exports (2024)
Country	Value exported (thousands USD)	Trade balance (thousands USD)	Quantity exported (carats)
World	79,559,517	−1,638,942	0
India	14,376,971	−3,316,807	32,742,431
United States	12,428,105	−2,934,113	8,878,538
Hong Kong	12,182,820	117,663	27,321,177
United Arab Emirates	10,090,185	−972,462	0
Belgium	7,022,360	910,028	330,000,000
Israel	5,609,820	2,541,593	0
Botswana	2,502,818	1,205,404	35,000,000
Russia	1,744,266	1,605,594	0
South Africa	1,683,914	1,120,324	6,344,960
Angola	1,531,386	1,531,385	51,055,000
Switzerland	1,393,112	−333,441	0
Thailand	1,204,558	−334,332	2,859,557
China	1,155,336	−2,795,067	6,009,972
Canada	1,071,241	862,294	11,180,249
Namibia	1,059,037	882,101	10,000,000
United Kingdom	759,648	−292,769	25,000,000
Armenia	485,632	−15,243	10,000,000
Singapore	350,406	27,435	1,027,889
DR Congo	320,597	320,597	0
France	269,722	−700,312	20,000,000
Lesotho	236,469	236,469	30,000,000
Zimbabwe	219,988	219,988	5,000,000
Italy	176,039	−568,920	5,000,000
Sri Lanka	157,706	−33,486	357,005
Australia	93,821	−105,783	35,420
Vietnam	90,940	−194,437	0
Cambodia	89,454	30,881	0
Japan	76,609	−523,749	307,942
Tanzania	53,156	53,156	0
Sierra Leone	48,557	48,557	0
Germany	44,997	−95,251	0
Belarus	38,308	37,908	0
Mexico	30,051	−73,469	0
Netherlands	28,284	−58,171	0
South Korea	24,491	−61,208	5,000,000
Malaysia	24,216	−31,009	8,327
Laos	23,647	6,884	0
Mauritius	20,560	4,240	19,156
Taiwan	17,237	−40,165	0
Liberia	17,206	17,206	0
Turkey	15,085	−161,637	0
Spain	14,321	−29,237	27,796
Guinea	14,235	14,235	0
Central African Republic	12,868	12,868	75,000,000
Brazil	11,628	−15,884	0
Ghana	11,611	11,161	0
Bahrain	9,306	−6,247	0
Guyana	7,297	7,297	0
Lebanon	6,584	−15,924	0
Austria	5,237	−7,259	0
Denmark	3,723	−8,639	5,000,000
Sweden	2,691	−5,416	0
Saudi Arabia	2,539	−26,584	0
Greece	2,108	−6,797	0
Ireland	2,076	−8,777	30,000,000
Indonesia	1,980	−68,872	0
Qatar	1,643	−71,819	0
Luxembourg	1,036	−441	0
Panama	1,029	−706	0
Gibraltar	956	474	0
New Zealand	732	−14,398	0
Czech Republic	693	−13,912	0
Cyprus	639	−12,833	0
British Virgin Islands	609	−640	28
Norway	510	−6,335	0
Finland	503	−4,604	0
Ukraine	440	−1,760	0
Bhutan	364	364	167
Latvia	330	264	0
Congo	325	325	0
Dominican Republic	296	−485	0
Poland	244	−12,921	493
Costa Rica	200	−4,052	0
Croatia	164	−1,391	0
Oman	131	−24,244	263
Belize	127	−179	0
Nigeria	98	70	0
Antigua and Barbuda	94	94	0
Kuwait	77	−2,773	0
Barbados	71	71	0
Afghanistan	54	24	0
Jordan	52	−2,854	104
Romania	46	−2,603	0
Côte d'Ivoire	44	44	0
Kazakhstan	30	−2,248	0
Venezuela	26	26	6
Portugal	24	−908	0
Malta	18	−1,768	0
Azerbaijan	16	6	0
Pakistan	13	13	0
Estonia	11	−661	0
Slovenia	11	−1,587	0
Slovakia	10	−177	0
Bahamas	2	−11	100
Cameroon	2	−36	11
Aruba	2	−1,401	1
Kyrgyzstan	2	−530	0
Hungary	2	−590	0
Lithuania	1	−619	0

== Observatory of Economic Complexity ==
Data is for 2023, in United States dollars.

List of countries by diamond exports (2023)
Country	Trade value
India	19,276,675,310
United Arab Emirates	11,644,021,313
Belgium	10,761,254,059
United States	9,398,686,571
Israel	8,610,838,525
Botswana	5,311,941,452
South Africa	4,483,765,032
Canada	4,386,887,071
Hong Kong	3,874,953,320
Russia	3,816,699,626
Angola	3,420,210,305
China	1,769,387,031
Switzerland	1,355,237,540
Thailand	1,021,396,483
Namibia	852,290,305
Armenia	714,017,038
Singapore	502,426,390
Lesotho	475,811,687
United Kingdom	474,320,906
Zimbabwe	451,650,846
France	426,423,032
Australia	348,562,154
Lebanon	311,943,586
Japan	255,077,064
DR Congo	247,275,095
Sri Lanka	227,037,383
Vietnam	205,318,765
Italy	200,175,578
Mauritius	183,018,589
Sierra Leone	137,073,935
Cambodia	136,463,855
Curacao	89,895,274
Germany	77,202,265
Brazil	54,027,110
Tanzania	50,643,806
Taiwan	36,584,618
Malaysia	34,047,217
Macau	30,702,638
Saudi Arabia	30,036,616
South Korea	29,432,417
Laos	27,041,188
Turkey	26,311,645
Belarus	24,568,012
Colombia	21,536,421
Netherlands	21,189,515
Central African Republic	21,033,455
Spain	19,924,964
Guyana	19,570,117
Liberia	18,255,401
Austria	17,281,814
Guinea	16,006,287
Ghana	13,642,470
Congo	9,883,068
Indonesia	8,032,878
Bahrain	5,941,742
British Virgin Islands	4,894,371
Portugal	4,343,506
Azerbaijan	4,041,686
Greece	3,772,353
Denmark	2,802,945
Gibraltar	2,270,021
Madagascar	1,864,602
Sweden	1,667,784
Mexico	1,667,480
Ireland	1,658,405
Czechia	1,598,810
Bulgaria	1,525,280
Qatar	1,461,258
Zambia	1,364,114
Estonia	1,053,632
New Zealand	1,052,253
Micronesia	1,014,146
Uganda	1,001,938
Moldova	985,815
Argentina	854,449
Nigeria	721,959
Serbia	688,000
Mozambique	670,513
Bahamas	667,089
Cyprus	644,840
Cote d'Ivoire	580,641
Dominican Republic	534,841
Rwanda	465,008
Latvia	456,857
Mongolia	380,540
Kuwait	345,122
Ukraine	341,967
Iceland	296,606
Norway	272,712
Hungary	237,702
Lithuania	211,779
Kazakhstan	208,425
Poland	208,397
Finland	204,978
Costa Rica	175,317
Croatia	168,987
Bosnia and Herzegovina	167,720
Romania	132,255
Venezuela	125,308
Mali	107,636
Belize	90,922
Saint Barthelemy	90,905
Oman	87,902
Philippines	74,871
Niger	74,684
Cameroon	73,009
Slovakia	66,105
Guam	63,170
French Polynesia	45,795
Andorra	43,059
Panama	38,120
Pakistan	29,795
Luxembourg	21,165
Fiji	19,839
Uruguay	16,450
Gabon	15,083
Honduras	14,186
Myanmar	12,378
North Macedonia	10,619
Bolivia	7,650
Burkina Faso	6,680
Greenland	5,341
Jamaica	5,200
Slovenia	3,974
Brunei	3,397
Iraq	3,255
Afghanistan	1,114
Guatemala	684
Egypt	483
Tunisia	67
Malta	53
Ecuador	4

== See also ==
- List of countries by diamond production

== Sources ==
- atlas.media.mit.edu - Observatory of Economic complexity - Countries that export Diamonds (2012)
- atlas.media.mit.edu - Observatory of Economic complexity - Countries that export Diamonds (2015)
- atlas.media.mit.edu - Observatory of Economic complexity - Countries that export Diamonds (2016)
