= List of countries by diamond production =

This is a list of countries by diamond production, based on data reported by the Kimberley Process Certification Scheme.

List of countries by diamond production (2024)
Country	Diamond production		
Country	Carats	Thousands USD	USD per carat
Russia	37,322,794	3,335,490	89.37
Botswana	18,125,016	1,359,240	74.99
Angola	14,027,003	1,412,180	100.68
Canada	13,321,628	1,075,010	80.70
DR Congo	9,788,202	106,060	44.92
South Africa	5,340,219	662,350	124.03
Zimbabwe	5,293,329	163,760	30.94
Namibia	2,319,489	966,940	25.42
Lesotho	695,888	232,070	348.48
Sierra Leone	573,983	103,090	179.60
Tanzania	373,679	53,450	143.04
Ghana	332,790	14,950	44.59
Guinea	113,379	5,060	124.91
Central African Republic	111,377	10,560	94.83
Guyana	51,922	6,490	42.19
Brazil	49,808	9,460	189.91
Liberia	47,812	16,660	4.71
Cameroon	11,220	330	29.67
Congo	1,696	40	10.84
Mali	913	0	416.88
Ivory Coast	868	40	333.49
Venezuela	800	–	–
India	419	–	–

== See also ==
- List of countries by diamond exports
- List of diamond mines
