= St. Louis Fed Financial Stress Index =

The St. Louis Fed Financial Stress Index (STLFSI) is an index measuring the degree of financial stress in markets published by the Federal Reserve Bank of St. Louis.

== History ==
The STLFSI was first published in early 2010, with data going back to 1993, in an effort to better gauge levels of financial stress in the aftermath of the 2008 financial crisis. It has been updated three times since, with the current version referred to as the STLFSI4. STLFSI3 used the past 90-day average backward looking secured overnight financing rate (SOFR) in two spreads, whereas the latest version uses the 90-day forward looking SOFR

== Construction ==
Numerous ways to determine financial stress exist. Instead of focusing on just one variable at the expense of others, such as default risk or liquidity risk, this index encompasses multiple measures. Unlike the similar but less comprehensive Kansas City Financial Stress Index (KCFSI) from the Federal Reserve Bank of Kansas City that uses only 11 variables, this index uses 18 weekly data series that include seven interest rate series, six yield spreads and five other indicators to capture some element of financial stress:

- Interest rates: the effective federal funds rate; 2-year, 10-year, and 30-year Treasury yields; the average yield on a Baa-rated corporate bond; the Merrill Lynch High-Yield Corporate Master II Index; the Merrill Lynch Asset-Backed Master BBB-rated
- Yield spreads: the 10-year Treasury minus 3-month Treasury yield; the Corporate Baa-rated bond minus 10-year Treasury (corporate credit risk spread); the Merrill Lynch High-Yield Corporate Master II Index minus 10-year Treasury (high-yield credit risk spread); the 3-month London Interbank Offering Rate–Overnight Index Swap spread (3-month LIBOR-OIS spread); the 3-month Treasury-Eurodollar spread (TED spread); the 3-month commercial paper minus 3-month Treasury bill (3-month commercial paper spread)
- Other indicators: the J.P. Morgan Emerging Markets Bond Index Plus; the Chicago Board Options Exchange Market Volatility Index (VIX); the Merrill Lynch Bond Market Volatility Index (1-month); the 10-year nominal Treasury yield minus 10-year Treasury Inflation Protected Security (TIPS) yield (10-year breakeven inflation rate); the S&P 500 Financials Index

The units are not seasonally adjusted. The data series are likely to move together as the level of financial stress in the economy changes. It is also updated and published weekly, on each Friday, instead of monthly. The data has a one-week lag.

== Interpretation and uses ==
The average value of the index is designed to be zero to represent normal financial market conditions. A value below zero indicates below-average financial market stress; a value above zero suggests above-average financial market stress. Movements in the index are measured in basis points.

The high and low of this index has varied widely. During times of financial stress, such as the Lehman Brothers or Fannie Mae and Freddie Mac bankruptcies of 2008, the Greek credit crisis of 2010, or the U.S. credit rating downgrade of 2011, the value on the index spiked. It would then subsequently fall as concerns eased.

The all-time high of 5.257 basis points on October 17, 2008, during the height of the 2008 financial crisis. It reached an all-time low of -1.602 basis points on February 14, 2020, before rising as fears for the coronavirus became more widely held.

The index also provides a way to analyze global liquidity. Research has determined the index is relevant to cross-border bank flows in 149 countries. Specifically, a 10% increase in the index means the countries receive on average 0.420% less cross-border bank loans.

The St. Louis Federal Reserve provides updates to movement in the index via Twitter.
