= Global recession =

Recession that affects many countries around the world

A global recession is a recession that affects many countries around the world—that is, a period of global economic slowdown or declining economic output. Since World War II, the International Monetary Fund (IMF) has identified five such recessions, with the COVID-19 recession being the most severe.

Countries by real GDP growth rate (2020)

Countries by real GDP growth rate (2009)

Countries by real GDP growth rate (2014)

Number of countries having a banking crisis in each year since 1800. This is based on This time is different: Eight centuries of financial folly, which covers only 70 countries. The general upward trend might be attributed to many factors. One of these is a gradual increase in the percent of people who receive money for their labor. The dramatic feature of this graph is the virtual absence of banking crises during the period of the Bretton Woods agreement, 1945 to 1971. This analysis is similar to Figure 10.1 in Reinhart and Rogoff (2009). For more details see the help file for "bankingCrises" in the Ecdat package available from the Comprehensive R Archive Network (CRAN).

== Definitions ==
The International Monetary Fund defines a global recession as "a decline in annual per‑capita real World GDP (purchasing power parity weighted), backed up by a decline or worsening for one or more of the seven other global macroeconomic indicators: Industrial production, trade, capital flows, oil consumption, unemployment rate, per‑capita investment, and per‑capita consumption".

According to this definition, since World War II there were only five global recessions (in 1975, 1982, 1991, 2009, and 2020), all of them only lasting a year (although the 1991 recession would have lasted until 1993 if the IMF had used normal exchange rate weighted per‑capita real World GDP rather than the purchasing power parity weighted per‑capita real World GDP). The 2020 recession, also known as the COVID-19 recession, was by far the worst of the five postwar recessions, both in terms of the number of countries affected and the decline in real World GDP per capita.

Before April 2009, the IMF argued that a global annual real GDP growth rate of 3.0 percent or less was "equivalent to a global recession". By this measure, there were seven global recessions since 1970: 1974–75, 1984–85, 1990–93, 1996, 2008–09, 2018–19, and 2020-21.

== National vs. global recession ==
Informally, a national recession is a period of declining economic output. In a 1974 New York Times article, Julius Shiskin suggested several rules of thumb to identify a recession, which included two successive quarterly declines in gross domestic product (GDP), a measure of the nation's output. This two-quarter metric is now a commonly held definition of a recession. In the United States, the National Bureau of Economic Research (NBER) is regarded as the authority which identifies a recession and which takes into account several measures in addition to GDP growth before making an assessment. In many developed nations (but not the United States), the two-quarter rule is also used for identifying a recession.

Whereas a national recession is identified by two quarters of decline, defining a global recession is more difficult, because a developing country is expected to have a higher GDP growth than a developed country. According to the IMF, the real GDP growth of the emerging and developing countries is on an uptrend and that of advanced economies is on a downtrend since the late 1980s. The world growth is projected to slow from 5% in 2007 to 3.75% in 2008 and to just over 2% in 2009. Downward revisions in GDP growth vary across regions. Among the most affected are commodity exporters, and countries with acute external financing and liquidity problems. If a global recession were to occur in its full magnitude, an estimated 100 million jobs would be lost around the world, with total lost capital hovering at US$120 trillion. Countries in East Asia (including China) have suffered smaller declines because their financial situations are more robust. They have benefited from falling commodity prices and they have initiated a shift toward macroeconomic policy easing.

The IMF estimates that global recessions occur over a cycle lasting between eight and ten years. During what the IMF terms the past three global recessions of the last three decades, global per capita output growth was zero or negative.

== See also ==
- 2000s energy crisis (2003–2008)
- 2007–2008 world food price crisis
- COVID-19 recession (2020–2022)
- 2008 financial crisis
- Great Recession (2007–2009)
- Great Depression (1929–1939)
