= Forward estimates =

Prediction of budget expenditure and revenue

Forward estimates are budget projections for revenue, expenses and financial position for the three years beyond the current (budgeted) fiscal year. The “forward estimates” system evolved in Australia from the late 1970s through the 1980s, and is used at both the federal and state levels.

The forward estimates provide a mechanism for discipline within the budgeting process that enables a greater focus on strategic policy issues, and provide a strategic framework for budgetary decision-making in the medium-term. Depending on the context, the forward estimates period can refer to the three years following the budget year or the four years inclusive of the budget year.

Forward estimates are based on assumptions about local and global economic parameters, and the process develops estimates for the level and composition of expenditures for three years beyond the budgeted fiscal year, with the assumption that existing policies are maintained, planned policies are implemented, and that the government's planned objectives continue to be pursued. This is known as the 'same policy basis'. The 'same policy' estimates are not forecasts, since they only provide a projected outcome under a scenario where existing policy remains unchanged and the economic assumptions remain valid. Any change to policy or economic conditions will affect the projections.

The Charter of Budget Honesty Act 1998 places an obligation on the government to regularly update the economic projections, including annually for the Budget economic and fiscal outlook report, semi-annually for the Mid-year economic and fiscal outlook report (MYEFO) and, prior to an election, for the Pre-election economic and fiscal outlook report (PEFO).

At a federal level, the Department of Finance is responsible for updating the forward estimates at regular intervals to reflect changes in economic parameters and the effects of government policy decisions. Thus, the Department of Finance is seen as "owning" the forward estimates.
