= 2022 Cronulla-Sutherland Sharks season =

- NRL Rank: 2nd
- Play-off result: Semi-finalist
- 2022 record: Wins: 18; draws: 0; losses: 6
- Points scored: For: 573; against: 364

Team information
- CEO: Dino Mezzatesta
- Coach: Craig Fitzgibbon
- Assistant coach: Josh Hannay; Daniel Holdsworth; Steve Price
- Captain: Wade Graham (15 games) Dale Finucane (8 games) Nicho Hynes (3 games)
- Stadium: PointsBet Stadium (10 games); Suncorp Stadium (1 game); C.ex Coffs International Stadium (1 game)
- Avg. attendance: 10,520

Top scorers
- Tries: Ronaldo Mulitalo (17)
- Goals: Nicho Hynes (83)
- Points: Nicho Hynes (194)
| ← 2021 | 2023 → |

The 2022 Cronulla-Sutherland Sharks season was the 56th in the club's history. The club was coached by Craig Fitzgibbon in his first season with the Sharks and captained by Wade Graham. The team competed in the National Rugby League's 2022 Telstra Premiership.

== Milestones ==
- Round 1: Matt Ikuvalu made his debut for the club, after previously playing for the Sydney Roosters.
- Round 1: Nicho Hynes made his debut for the club, after previously playing for the Melbourne Storm and kicked his 1st goal for the club.
- Round 1: Dale Finucane made his debut for the club, after previously playing for the Melbourne Storm.
- Round 1: Matt Moylan kicked his 1st field goal for the club.
- Round 2: Sione Katoa played his 50th career and club game.
- Round 2: Cameron McInnes made his debut for the club, after previously playing for the St. George Illawarra Dragons.
- Round 3: Matt Moylan played his 150th career game.
- Round 3: Matt Ikuvalu scored his 1st try for the club.
- Round 3: Nicho Hynes kicked his 1st career field goal for the club.
- Round 4: Aiden Tolman played his 300th career game.
- Round 6: Toby Rudolf played his 50th career and club game.
- Round 7: William Kennedy played his 50th career and club game.
- Round 8: Siosifa Talakai played his 50th career game.
- Round 8: Nicho Hynes played his 50th career game.
- Round 11: Lachlan Miller made his NRL debut and scored his 1st career try for the club.
- Round 12: Andrew Fifita played his 200th game for the club.
- Round 12: Ronaldo Mulitalo played his 50th career and club game.
- Round 12: Tom Hazelton made his NRL debut for the club.
- Round 12: Cameron McInnes scored his 1st try for the club.
- Round 18: Jesse Colquhoun made his NRL debut for the club.
- Round 18: Connor Tracey played his 50th career game.
- Round 20: Connor Tracey played his 50th game for the club.
- Round 21: Kade Dykes made his NRL debut for the club.
- Round 22: Cameron McInnes played his 150th career game.
- Round 22: Kade Dykes scored his 1st career try for the club.
- Round 24: Kayal Iro made his NRL debut for the club.
- Finals Week 1: Andrew Fifita played his 250th career game.

== Fixtures ==
=== Pre-season ===
| Date | Round | Opponent | Venue | Result | Score | Tries | Goals | Field Goals | Report |
|---|---|---|---|---|---|---|---|---|---|
| 20 February | Trial Match | Penrith Panthers | CommBank Stadium, Sydney | Loss | 6-34 | Tom Hazelton (59') 1 | Braydon Trindall 1/1 (61') | | |
Team Details: FB / 1 / Kade Dykes; WG / 2 / Sam Stonestreet; CE / 3 / Jensen Taumoepeau; CE / 4 / Kayal Iro; WG / 5 / Jonaiah Lualua; FE / 6 / Braydon Trindall / (yellow card) 10'; HB / 7 / Ryan Rivett; PR / 8 / Braden Hamlin-Uele (c); HK / 9 / Jayden Berrell; PR / 10 / Royce Hunt; SR / 11 / Siosifa Talakai; SR / 12 / Teig Wilton; LK / 13 / Jesse Colquhoun; Interchange: IC / 14 / Zac Cini; IC / 15 / Jack Martin; IC / 16 / Franklin Pele / (yellow card) 69'; IC / 17 / Jordan Samrani; IC / 18 / Rhys Davies; IC / 19 / Zac Woolford; IC / 20 / Charbel Tasipale; IC / 22 / Angus Ernst; IC / 23 / Reubenn Rennie; IC / 24 / Tom Hazelton; IC / 25 / Josh Finau; Coach: / / Craig Fitzgibbon
| 28 February | Trial Match | Canterbury-Bankstown Bulldogs | PointsBet Stadium, Sydney | Win | 30-6 | Braydon Trindall (8') 1 Briton Nikora (21') 1 Royce Hunt (30') 1 William Kennedy (35') 1 Ronaldo Mulitalo (51') 1 | Nicho Hynes 5/5 (9', 22', 32', 37', 53') | | |
Team Details: FB / 1 / William Kennedy; WG / 2 / Sione Katoa; CE / 3 / Connor Tracey; CE / 4 / Jesse Ramien; WG / 5 / Ronaldo Mulitalo; FE / 6 / Braydon Trindall; HB / 7 / Nicho Hynes; PR / 16 / Andrew Fifita; HK / 9 / Blayke Brailey; PR / 10 / Braden Hamlin-Uele / (yellow card) 61'; SR / 11 / Briton Nikora; SR / 12 / Wade Graham (c); LK / 13 / Dale Finucane; Interchange: IC / 14 / Matt Ikuvalu; IC / 15 / Teig Wilton; IC / 17 / Jesse Colquhoun; IC / 18 / Royce Hunt; IC / 19 / Luke Metcalf; IC / 20 / Lachlan Miller; IC / 21 / Reubenn Rennie; IC / 22 / Jayden Berrell; IC / 23 / Jonaiah Lualua; IC / 24 / Tom Hazelton; IC / 25 / Franklin Pele; IC / 28 / Kayal Iro; IC / 29 / Jensen Taumoepeau; Reserves: RE / 8 / Toby Rudolf; RE / 17 / Siosifa Talakai; Coach: / / Craig Fitzgibbon
Legend: Win Loss Draw Bye

=== Regular season ===
| Date | Round | Opponent | Venue | Result | Score | Tries | Goals | Field Goals | Report |
|---|---|---|---|---|---|---|---|---|---|
| 11 March | 1 | Canberra Raiders | GIO Stadium, Canberra | Loss | 19-24 | Blayke Brailey (22') 1 William Kennedy (49') 1 Teig Wilton (53') 1 | Nicho Hynes 3/3 (24', 50', 54') | Matt Moylan 1/1 (72') | |
Team Details: FB / 1 / William Kennedy; WG / 2 / Sione Katoa; CE / 3 / Jesse Ramien; CE / 4 / Ronaldo Mulitalo; WG / 5 / Matt Ikuvalu; FE / 6 / Matt Moylan; HB / 7 / Nicho Hynes; PR / 8 / Toby Rudolf / (substituted off) 21' / (substituted on) 58' / (substituted off) 74'; HK / 9 / Blayke Brailey; PR / 10 / Braden Hamlin-Uele / (substituted off) 21' / (substituted on) 67'; SR / 11 / Briton Nikora; SR / 12 / Teig Wilton; LK / 13 / Dale Finucane (c) / (substituted off) 47' / (substituted on) 63'; Interchange: IC / 14 / Aiden Tolman / (substituted on) 21' / (substituted off) 63' / (substituted on) 74'; IC / 15 / Siosifa Talakai / (substituted on) 47' / (substituted off) 67'; IC / 16 / Royce Hunt / (substituted on) 47' / (substituted off) 58'; IC / 17 / Andrew Fifita / (substituted on) 21' / (substituted off) 47'; Concussion Substitute: RE / 18 / Luke Metcalf; Reserves: RE / 19 / Jesse Colquhoun; RE / 20 / Lachlan Miller; RE / 21 / Jensen Taumoepeau; RE / 22 / Jayden Berrell; RE / 23 / Jonaiah Lualua; RE / 24 / Tom Hazelton; Coach: / / Josh Hannay and Steve Price (Note: Deputised for Craig Fitzgibbon due to Covid protocols.)
| 19 March | 2 | Parramatta Eels | PointsBet Stadium, Sydney | Win | 18-16 | Ronaldo Mulitalo (11') 1 Sione Katoa (28') 1 Connor Tracey (57') 1 Teig Wilton (79') 1 | Nicho Hynes 1/4 (80') | | |
Team Details: FB / 1 / William Kennedy; WG / 2 / Sione Katoa; CE / 3 / Jesse Ramien; CE / 20 / Connor Tracey; WG / 4 / Ronaldo Mulitalo / (substituted off) 40'; FE / 6 / Matt Moylan; HB / 7 / Nicho Hynes; PR / 8 / Toby Rudolf / (substituted off) 25' / (substituted on) 60'; HK / 9 / Blayke Brailey; PR / 10 / Braden Hamlin-Uele / (substituted off) 19' / (substituted on) 65'; SR / 11 / Briton Nikora; SR / 12 / Teig Wilton / (substituted off) 26' / (substituted on) 40'; LK / 13 / Dale Finucane (c) / (substituted off) 60' / (substituted on) 76'; Interchange: IC / 14 / Aiden Tolman / (substituted on) 19' / (substituted off) 65'; IC / 15 / Siosifa Talakai / (substituted on) 26'; IC / 17 / Andrew Fifita / (substituted on) 25' / (substituted off) 51'; IC / 19 / Cameron McInnes / (substituted on) 51' / (substituted off) 76'; Concussion Substitute: RE / 5 / Matt Ikuvalu; Reserves: RE / 16 / Royce Hunt; RE / 18 / Luke Metcalf; RE / 21 / Jensen Taumoepeau; RE / 22 / Lachlan Miller; RE / 23 / Jayden Berrell; RE / 24 / Franklin Pele; Coach: / / Craig Fitzgibbon
| 24 March | 3 | St. George Illawarra Dragons | WIN Stadium, Wollongong | Win | 36-12 | Sione Katoa (17') 1 Matt Ikuvalu (21') 1 Siosifa Talakai (35') 1 Jesse Ramien (48') 1 Braden Hamlin-Uele (53') 1 Nicho Hynes (66') 1 | Nicho Hynes 6/7 (19', 37', 39' pen, 49', 55', 67') | | |
Team Details: FB / 1 / William Kennedy; WG / 2 / Sione Katoa; CE / 3 / Jesse Ramien / (yellow card) 72'; CE / 4 / Connor Tracey / / (substituted off) 44' / (substituted on) 57' / (substituted off) 59'; WG / 5 / Matt Ikuvalu; FE / 6 / Matt Moylan; HB / 7 / Nicho Hynes; PR / 8 / Toby Rudolf / / (substituted off) 26' / (substituted on) 44'; HK / 9 / Blayke Brailey / / (substituted off) 74'; PR / 10 / Braden Hamlin-Uele / / (substituted off) 16' / (substituted on) 51' / (substituted off) 75'; SR / 11 / Briton Nikora; SR / 12 / Siosifa Talakai; LK / 13 / Dale Finucane (c) / / (substituted off) 16' / (substituted on) 16' / (substituted off) 28' / (substituted on) 54' / (substituted off) 66'; Interchange: IC / 14 / Aiden Tolman / / (substituted on) 16' / (substituted off) 54' / (substituted on) 74'; IC / 15 / Cameron McInnes / / (substituted on) 28' / (substituted off) 57' / (substituted on) 59'; IC / 16 / Braydon Trindall / / (substituted on) 66'; IC / 17 / Andrew Fifita / (yellow card) 78' / (substituted on) 26' / (substituted off) 51' / (substituted on) 75'; Concussion Substitute: RE / 18 / Luke Metcalf; Reserves: RE / 19 / Royce Hunt; RE / 20 / Jack Williams; RE / 21 / Lachlan Miller; RE / 22 / Franklin Pele; RE / 23 / Jensen Taumoepeau; RE / 24 / Tom Hazelton; Coach: / / Craig Fitzgibbon
| 1 April | 4 | Newcastle Knights | PointsBet Stadium, Sydney | Win | 18-0 | Aiden Tolman (26') 1 Sione Katoa (39') 1 Siosifa Talakai (68') 1 William Kennedy (75') 1 | Nicho Hynes 1/4 (76') | | |
Team Details: FB / 1 / William Kennedy; WG / 2 / Sione Katoa; CE / 3 / Jesse Ramien; CE / 4 / Siosifa Talakai; WG / 5 / Ronaldo Mulitalo / / (substituted off) 60' / (substituted on) 60'; FE / 6 / Matt Moylan; HB / 7 / Nicho Hynes; PR / 8 / Toby Rudolf / / (substituted off) 25' / (substituted on) 55' / (substituted off) 72'; HK / 9 / Blayke Brailey / (yellow card) 79'; PR / 10 / Braden Hamlin-Uele / / (substituted off) 23' / (substituted on) 60' / (substituted off) 75'; SR / 11 / Briton Nikora; SR / 12 / Teig Wilton; LK / 13 / Dale Finucane (c) / / (substituted off) 31' / (substituted on) 59' / (substituted off) 75'; Interchange: IC / 14 / Aiden Tolman / / (substituted on) 23' / (substituted off) 59' / (substituted on) 75'; IC / 15 / Cameron McInnes / / (substituted on) 25' / (substituted off) 60' / (substituted on) 72'; IC / 16 / Braydon Trindall / / (substituted on) 75'; IC / 17 / Andrew Fifita / / (substituted on) 31' / (substituted off) 55'; Concussion Substitute: RE / 20 / Luke Metcalf; Reserves: RE / 18 / Mawene Hiroti; RE / 19 / Jack Williams; RE / 21 / Royce Hunt; RE / 22 / Lachlan Miller; RE / 23 / Jensen Taumoepeau; RE / 24 / Franklin Pele; Coach: / / Craig Fitzgibbon
| 10 April | 5 | Wests Tigers | PointsBet Stadium, Sydney | Win | 30-4 | Sione Katoa (19', 35') 2 Briton Nikora (8') 1 Ronaldo Mulitalo (47') 1 Jesse Ramien (66') 1 William Kennedy (69') 1 | Nicho Hynes 3/6 (10', 48', 70') | | |
Team Details: FB / 1 / William Kennedy; WG / 2 / Sione Katoa; CE / 3 / Jesse Ramien; CE / 4 / Siosifa Talakai; WG / 5 / Ronaldo Mulitalo; FE / 6 / Matt Moylan; HB / 7 / Nicho Hynes; PR / 8 / Toby Rudolf / (substituted off) 28' / (substituted on) 52' / (substituted off) 66'; HK / 9 / Blayke Brailey / (substituted off) 70'; PR / 10 / Braden Hamlin-Uele / (substituted off) 27' / (substituted on) 59' / (substituted off) 76'; SR / 11 / Briton Nikora / (substituted off) 59'; SR / 12 / Teig Wilton / (substituted off) 22' / (substituted on) 36'; LK / 13 / Dale Finucane (c) / (substituted off) 36' / (substituted on) 66'; Interchange: IC / 15 / Cameron McInnes / (substituted on) 22'; IC / 17 / Andrew Fifita / (substituted on) 27' / (substituted off) 52' / (substituted on) 76'; IC / 18 / Jack Williams / (substituted on) 28' / (substituted off) 52' / (substituted on) 70'; IC / 21 / Royce Hunt / (substituted on) 52'; Concussion Substitute: RE / 19 / Mawene Hiroti; Reserves: RE / 14 / Aiden Tolman; RE / 16 / Braydon Trindall; RE / 20 / Lachlan Miller; RE / 22 / Jonaiah Lualua; RE / 23 / Kade Dykes; RE / 24 / Franklin Pele; Coach: / / Craig Fitzgibbon
| 16 April | 6 | Melbourne Storm | AAMI Park, Melbourne | Loss | 18-34 | Ronaldo Mulitalo (46', 60') 2 Siosifa Talakai (27') 1 | Nicho Hynes 3/5 (9' pen, 29', 62') | | |
Team Details: FB / 1 / William Kennedy; WG / 19 / Mawene Hiroti; CE / 3 / Jesse Ramien; CE / 4 / Siosifa Talakai; WG / 5 / Ronaldo Mulitalo; FE / 6 / Matt Moylan; HB / 7 / Nicho Hynes; PR / 8 / Toby Rudolf / (substituted off) 32' / (substituted on) 58'; HK / 9 / Blayke Brailey; PR / 10 / Braden Hamlin-Uele / (substituted off) 23' / (substituted on) 65' / (substituted off) 74'; SR / 15 / Cameron McInnes; SR / 12 / Teig Wilton; LK / 13 / Dale Finucane (c) / (substituted off) 7'; Interchange: IC / 14 / Aiden Tolman / (substituted on) 7' / (substituted off) 52' / (substituted on) 74'; IC / 16 / Jack Williams / (substituted on) 23' / (substituted off) 65'; IC / 17 / Andrew Fifita / (substituted on) 32' / (substituted off) 58'; IC / 18 / Braydon Trindall / (substituted on) 52'; Concussion Substitute: RE / 21 / Royce Hunt; Reserves: RE / 2 / Sione Katoa; RE / 11 / Briton Nikora; RE / 20 / Lachlan Miller; RE / 22 / Kade Dykes; RE / 23 / Jonaiah Lualua; RE / 24 / Franklin Pele; Coach: / / Craig Fitzgibbon
| 21 April | 7 | Manly Sea Eagles | PointsBet Stadium, Sydney | Win | 34-22 | Siosifa Talakai (1', 14') 2 Ronaldo Mulitalo (19', 26') 2 William Kennedy (28') 1 Teig Wilton (39') 1 | Nicho Hynes 5/7 (15', 20', 30', 40', 78' pen) | | |
Team Details: FB / 1 / William Kennedy / (substituted off) 67'; WG / 2 / Sione Katoa; CE / 3 / Jesse Ramien; CE / 4 / Siosifa Talakai; WG / 5 / Ronaldo Mulitalo; FE / 6 / Matt Moylan; HB / 7 / Nicho Hynes (c); PR / 8 / Toby Rudolf / (substituted off) 25' / (substituted on) 51' / (substituted off) 74'; HK / 9 / Blayke Brailey; PR / 16 / Royce Hunt / (substituted off) 18' / (substituted on) 61' / (substituted off) 72'; SR / 11 / Briton Nikora; SR / 12 / Teig Wilton; LK / 13 / Cameron McInnes / (substituted off) 31' / (substituted on) 57'; Interchange: IC / 10 / Aiden Tolman / (substituted on) 18' / (substituted off) 31' / (substituted on) 31' / (substituted off) 61' / (substituted on) 72'; IC / 14 / Braydon Trindall / (substituted on) 67'; IC / 15 / Jack Williams / (substituted on) 25' / (substituted off) 57' / (substituted on) 74'; IC / 17 / Andrew Fifita / (substituted on) 31' / (substituted off) 51'; Concussion Substitute: RE / 18 / Lachlan Miller; Reserves: RE / 19 / Mawene Hiroti; RE / 20 / Matt Ikuvalu; RE / 21 / Jesse Colquhoun; RE / 22 / Kayal Iro; RE / 23 / Tom Hazelton; RE / 24 / Franklin Pele; Coach: / / Craig Fitzgibbon
| 28 April | 8 | Brisbane Broncos | Suncorp Stadium, Brisbane | Loss | 7-16 | Matt Moylan (19') 1 | Nicho Hynes 1/1 (20') | Nicho Hynes 1/1 (39') | |
Team Details: FB / 1 / William Kennedy; WG / 2 / Sione Katoa; CE / 3 / Jesse Ramien; CE / 4 / Siosifa Talakai; WG / 5 / Ronaldo Mulitalo; FE / 6 / Matt Moylan; HB / 7 / Nicho Hynes (c); PR / 8 / Toby Rudolf / (substituted off) 29' / (substituted on) 49' / (substituted off) 66'; HK / 9 / Blayke Brailey; PR / 16 / Royce Hunt / (substituted off) 16' / (substituted on) 66'; SR / 11 / Briton Nikora; SR / 12 / Teig Wilton / (substituted off) 56' / (substituted on) 72'; LK / 15 / Cameron McInnes / (substituted off) 49' / (substituted on) 56'; Interchange: IC / 10 / Aiden Tolman / (substituted on) 16' / (substituted off) 62'; IC / 14 / Jack Williams / (substituted on) 29' / (substituted off) 49'; IC / 18 / Braydon Trindall / (substituted on) 62'; IC / 19 / Wade Graham / (substituted on) 49' / (substituted off) 72'; Concussion Substitute: RE / 17 / Andrew Fifita; Reserves: RE / 13 / Dale Finucane; RE / 20 / Matt Ikuvalu; RE / 21 / Mawene Hiroti; RE / 22 / Lachlan Miller; RE / 23 / Luke Metcalf; RE / 24 / Franklin Pele; Coach: / / Craig Fitzgibbon
| 8 May | 9 | New Zealand Warriors | PointsBet Stadium, Sydney | Win | 29-10 | Connor Tracey (46', 66') 2 Nicho Hynes (7') 1 Teig Wilton (29') 1 Jesse Ramien (76') 1 | Nicho Hynes 4/5 (8', 31', 68', 78') | Nicho Hynes 1/1 (73') | |
Team Details: FB / 1 / William Kennedy / (red card) 16'; WG / 2 / Sione Katoa; CE / 3 / Jesse Ramien / (yellow card) 53'; CE / 4 / Siosifa Talakai; WG / 22 / Connor Tracey; FE / 6 / Matt Moylan; HB / 7 / Nicho Hynes; PR / 8 / Toby Rudolf / / (substituted off) 23' / (substituted on) 62' / (substituted off) 72'; HK / 9 / Blayke Brailey / / (substituted off) 78'; PR / 13 / Dale Finucane (c) / / (substituted off) 29' / (substituted on) 56'; SR / 11 / Briton Nikora; SR / 12 / Teig Wilton; LK / 15 / Cameron McInnes / / (substituted off) 56' / (substituted on) 72'; Interchange: IC / 10 / Aiden Tolman / / (substituted on) 23' / (substituted off) 50'; IC / 14 / Jack Williams / / (substituted on) 29' / (substituted off) 50'; IC / 16 / Wade Graham / / (substituted on) 50'; IC / 19 / Andrew Fifita / / (substituted on) 50' / (substituted off) 62' / (substituted on) 78'; Concussion Substitute: RE / 21 / Mawene Hiroti; Reserves: RE / 5 / Ronaldo Mulitalo; RE / 17 / Royce Hunt; RE / 18 / Braydon Trindall; RE / 20 / Luke Metcalf; RE / 23 / Matt Ikuvalu; RE / 24 / Franklin Pele; Coach: / / Craig Fitzgibbon
| 15 May | 10 | Canberra Raiders | Suncorp Stadium, Brisbane | Loss | 10-30 | Sione Katoa (54') 1 Royce Hunt (65') 1 | Nicho Hynes 1/2 (66') | | |
Team Details: FB / 1 / Nicho Hynes; WG / 2 / Sione Katoa / (substituted off) 77'; CE / 3 / Connor Tracey; CE / 4 / Siosifa Talakai; WG / 5 / Ronaldo Mulitalo; FE / 6 / Matt Moylan; HB / 7 / Braydon Trindall; PR / 8 / Toby Rudolf / (substituted off) 21' / (substituted on) 55'; HK / 9 / Blayke Brailey; PR / 13 / Dale Finucane (c) / (substituted off) 27' / (substituted on) 51' / (substituted off) 55'; SR / 11 / Briton Nikora; SR / 12 / Teig Wilton / (substituted off) 58' / (substituted on) 68'; LK / 14 / Cameron McInnes / (substituted off) 27' / (substituted on) 48'; Interchange: IC / 10 / Aiden Tolman / (substituted on) 21' / (substituted off) 48'; IC / 15 / Jack Williams / (substituted on) 27' / (substituted off) 33'; IC / 16 / Wade Graham / (substituted on) 27'; IC / 17 / Royce Hunt / (substituted on) 33' / (substituted off) 51' / (substituted on) 58' / (substituted off) 68'; Concussion Substitute: IC / 18 / Mawene Hiroti (Note: 18th man was activated during the match due to foul play.) / (substituted on) 77'; Reserves: RE / 19 / Andrew Fifita; RE / 20 / Luke Metcalf; RE / 21 / Lachlan Miller; RE / 22 / Jayden Berrell; RE / 23 / Jesse Colquhoun; RE / 24 / Tom Hazelton; Coach: / / Craig Fitzgibbon
| 22 May | 11 | Gold Coast Titans | Cbus Super Stadium, Gold Coast | Win | 25-18 | Connor Tracey (23') 1 Nicho Hynes (42') 1 Ronaldo Mulitalo (50') 1 Lachlan Miller (53') 1 | Nicho Hynes 4/4 (25', 44', 51', 55') | Nicho Hynes 1/1 (79') | |
Team Details: FB / 1 / Lachlan Miller; WG / 2 / Sione Katoa; CE / 3 / Connor Tracey; CE / 4 / Siosifa Talakai / / (substituted off) 68'; WG / 5 / Ronaldo Mulitalo; FE / 6 / Matt Moylan; HB / 7 / Nicho Hynes / (yellow card) 80'; PR / 8 / Toby Rudolf / / (substituted off) 32' / (substituted on) 49'; HK / 9 / Blayke Brailey; PR / 10 / Royce Hunt / / (substituted off) 24' / (substituted on) 68' / (substituted off) 76'; SR / 11 / Briton Nikora; SR / 12 / Wade Graham (c) / / (substituted off) 58'; LK / 13 / Cameron McInnes / / (substituted off) 32' / (substituted on) 62'; Interchange: IC / 14 / Aiden Tolman / / (substituted on) 24' / (substituted off) 62' / (substituted on) 76'; IC / 15 / Braydon Trindall / / (substituted on) 58'; IC / 16 / Teig Wilton / / (substituted on) 32'; IC / 17 / Andrew Fifita / / (substituted on) 32' / (substituted off) 49'; Concussion Substitute: RE / 18 / Kade Dykes; Reserves: RE / 19 / Tom Hazelton; RE / 20 / Luke Metcalf; RE / 21 / Mawene Hiroti; RE / 22 / Jayden Berrell; RE / 23 / Jesse Colquhoun; RE / 24 / Jonaiah Lualua; Coach: / / Craig Fitzgibbon
| 28 May | 12 | Sydney Roosters | PointsBet Stadium, Sydney | Loss | 16-36 | Ronaldo Mulitalo (55') 1 Sione Katoa (64') 1 Cameron McInnes (69') 1 | Nicho Hynes 2/3 (56', 70') | | |
Team Details: FB / 1 / William Kennedy; WG / 2 / Sione Katoa; CE / 3 / Connor Tracey; CE / 4 / Siosifa Talakai; WG / 5 / Ronaldo Mulitalo; FE / 6 / Matt Moylan; HB / 7 / Nicho Hynes (c); PR / 8 / Toby Rudolf / (substituted off) 33' / (substituted on) 51' / (substituted off) 75'; HK / 9 / Blayke Brailey; PR / 10 / Royce Hunt / (substituted off) 18' / (substituted on) 76'; SR / 11 / Briton Nikora; SR / 16 / Teig Wilton; LK / 13 / Cameron McInnes / (substituted off) 31' / (substituted on) 54' / (substituted off) 76'; Interchange: IC / 14 / Aiden Tolman / (substituted on) 18' / (substituted off) 51'; IC / 15 / Braydon Trindall / (substituted on) 51'; IC / 17 / Andrew Fifita / (substituted on) 31' / (substituted off) 51' / (substituted on) 75'; IC / 19 / Tom Hazelton / (substituted on) 33' / (substituted off) 54'; Concussion Substitute: RE / 18 / Lachlan Miller; Reserves: RE / 12 / Wade Graham; RE / 20 / Mawene Hiroti; RE / 21 / Kade Dykes; RE / 22 / Jesse Colquhoun; RE / 23 / Luke Metcalf; RE / 24 / Kayal Iro; Coach: / / Craig Fitzgibbon
| | 13 | Bye | | | | | | | |
| 12 June | 14 | New Zealand Warriors | Moreton Daily Stadium, Redcliffe | Win | 38-16 | Sione Katoa (14', 39', 76') 3 Ronaldo Mulitalo (23', 58') 2 Siosifa Talakai (17') 1 Matt Moylan (33') 1 William Kennedy (62') 1 | Nicho Hynes 3/8 (24', 34', 64') | | |
Team Details: FB / 1 / William Kennedy; WG / 2 / Sione Katoa; CE / 3 / Jesse Ramien; CE / 4 / Siosifa Talakai; WG / 5 / Ronaldo Mulitalo / (substituted off) 70'; FE / 6 / Matt Moylan; HB / 7 / Nicho Hynes; PR / 8 / Toby Rudolf / (substituted off) 31' / (substituted on) 54'; HK / 9 / Blayke Brailey / (substituted off) 75'; PR / 10 / Royce Hunt / (substituted off) 26' / (substituted on) 70'; SR / 11 / Briton Nikora; SR / 19 / Wade Graham (c) / (substituted off) 50'; LK / 13 / Cameron McInnes / (substituted off) 32' / (substituted on) 50'; Interchange: IC / 12 / Teig Wilton / (substituted on) 32'; IC / 14 / Aiden Tolman / (substituted on) 26' / (substituted off) 61' / (substituted on) 75'; IC / 15 / Braydon Trindall / (substituted on) 61'; IC / 17 / Andrew Fifita / (substituted on) 31' / (substituted off) 54'; Concussion Substitute: RE / 18 / Connor Tracey; Reserves: RE / 16 / Tom Hazelton; RE / 20 / Lachlan Miller; RE / 21 / Jesse Colquhoun; RE / 22 / Mawene Hiroti; Coach: / / Craig Fitzgibbon
| 18 June | 15 | Gold Coast Titans | C.ex Coffs International Stadium, Coffs Harbour | Win | 18-10 | Sione Katoa (10') 1 Matt Moylan (14') 1 Blayke Brailey (44') 1 | Nicho Hynes 3/4 (16', 46', 58' pen) | | |
Team Details: FB / 1 / William Kennedy; WG / 2 / Sione Katoa; CE / 3 / Jesse Ramien; CE / 4 / Siosifa Talakai; WG / 5 / Ronaldo Mulitalo; FE / 6 / Matt Moylan; HB / 7 / Nicho Hynes; PR / 8 / Toby Rudolf / (substituted off) 25' / (substituted on) 51'; HK / 9 / Blayke Brailey; PR / 10 / Royce Hunt / (substituted off) 19' / (substituted on) 68' / (substituted off) 76'; SR / 11 / Briton Nikora; SR / 12 / Wade Graham (c) / (substituted off) 51'; LK / 13 / Cameron McInnes / (substituted off) 31' / (substituted on) 61'; Interchange: IC / 14 / Aiden Tolman / (substituted on) 19' / (substituted off) 54'; IC / 15 / Braydon Trindall / (substituted on) 54' / (substituted off) 68'; IC / 16 / Teig Wilton / (substituted on) 31'; IC / 19 / Dale Finucane / (substituted on) 25' / (substituted off) 61' / (substituted on) 76'; Concussion Substitute: RE / 18 / Connor Tracey; Reserves: RE / 17 / Andrew Fifita; RE / 19 / Lachlan Miller; RE / 21 / Jesse Colquhoun; RE / 22 / Kade Dykes; Coach: / / Craig Fitzgibbon
| 2 July | 16 | Canterbury-Bankstown Bulldogs | CommBank Stadium, Sydney | Win | 18-6 | Ronaldo Mulitalo (5') 1 Sione Katoa (50') 1 Briton Nikora (63') 1 | Nicho Hynes 3/4 (6', 51', 64') | | |
Team Details: FB / 1 / William Kennedy; WG / 2 / Sione Katoa; CE / 3 / Jesse Ramien; CE / 4 / Siosifa Talakai; WG / 5 / Ronaldo Mulitalo; FE / 6 / Matt Moylan; HB / 7 / Nicho Hynes; PR / 8 / Toby Rudolf / (substituted off) 47' / (substituted on) 62' / (substituted off) 72'; HK / 9 / Blayke Brailey; PR / 10 / Royce Hunt / (substituted off) 19' / (substituted on) 72'; SR / 11 / Briton Nikora; SR / 12 / Wade Graham (c) / (substituted off) 35' / (substituted on) 68'; LK / 15 / Dale Finucane / (substituted off) 27' / (substituted on) 57'; Interchange: IC / 13 / Cameron McInnes / (substituted on) 27' / (substituted off) 68'; IC / 14 / Aiden Tolman / (substituted on) 19' / (substituted off) 57'; IC / 16 / Teig Wilton / (substituted on) 35'; IC / 17 / Andrew Fifita / (substituted on) 47' / (substituted off) 62'; Concussion Substitute: RE / 18 / Connor Tracey; Reserves: RE / 19 / Braydon Trindall; RE / 20 / Kade Dykes; RE / 21 / Jesse Colquhoun; RE / 22 / Lachlan Miller; Coach: / / Craig Fitzgibbon
| 7 July | 17 | Melbourne Storm | PointsBet Stadium, Sydney | Win | 28-6 | Jesse Ramien (11', 37', 74') 3 Blayke Brailey (14') 1 Ronaldo Mulitalo (33') 1 Sione Katoa (67') 1 | Braydon Trindall 2/6 (16', 35') | | |
Team Details: FB / 1 / William Kennedy; WG / 2 / Sione Katoa; CE / 3 / Jesse Ramien; CE / 4 / Connor Tracey; WG / 5 / Ronaldo Mulitalo; FE / 6 / Matt Moylan; HB / 18 / Braydon Trindall; PR / 17 / Andrew Fifita / (yellow card) 77' / (substituted off) 19' / (substituted on) 66'; HK / 9 / Blayke Brailey; PR / 10 / Royce Hunt / / (substituted off) 22' / (substituted on) 71'; SR / 11 / Briton Nikora; SR / 12 / Wade Graham (c) / / (substituted off) 43'; LK / 13 / Dale Finucane / / (substituted off) 47' / (substituted on) 60' / (substituted off) 71'; Interchange: IC / 14 / Aiden Tolman / / (substituted on) 19' / (substituted off) 66'; IC / 15 / Cameron McInnes / / (substituted on) 22'; IC / 16 / Teig Wilton / / (substituted on) 43'; IC / 21 / Braden Hamlin-Uele / / (substituted on) 47' / (substituted off) 60'; Concussion Substitute: RE / 19 / Jesse Colquhoun; Reserves: RE / 7 / Nicho Hynes; RE / 8 / Toby Rudolf; RE / 20 / Kade Dykes; RE / 22 / Lachlan Miller; Coach: / / Craig Fitzgibbon
| 15 July | 18 | North Queensland Cowboys | Queensland Country Bank Stadium, Townsville | Win | 26-12 | Jesse Ramien (3', 20') 2 Teig Wilton (59') 1 Sione Katoa (67') 1 | Nicho Hynes 5/5 (4', 21', 29' pen, 61', 70') | | |
Team Details: FB / 1 / William Kennedy; WG / 2 / Sione Katoa / / (substituted off) 70'; CE / 3 / Jesse Ramien; CE / 4 / Connor Tracey; WG / 5 / Ronaldo Mulitalo; FE / 6 / Matt Moylan; HB / 7 / Nicho Hynes; PR / 8 / Toby Rudolf / / (substituted off) 32' / (substituted on) 50'; HK / 9 / Blayke Brailey / (yellow card) 37'; PR / 10 / Royce Hunt / / (substituted off) 20'; SR / 11 / Teig Wilton; SR / 12 / Wade Graham (c) / / (substituted off) 53' / (substituted on) 70'; LK / 13 / Dale Finucane / / (substituted off) 50' / (substituted on) 65'; Interchange: IC / 15 / Cameron McInnes / / (substituted on) 20' / (substituted off) 74'; IC / 16 / Braden Hamlin-Uele / / (substituted on) 47' / (substituted off) 65' / (substituted on) 74'; IC / 17 / Andrew Fifita / / (substituted on) 32' / (substituted off) 47'; IC / 19 / Jesse Colquhoun / / (substituted on) 53'; Concussion Substitute: RE / 18 / Braydon Trindall; Reserves: RE / 14 / Aiden Tolman; RE / 20 / Kade Dykes; RE / 21 / Siosifa Talakai; RE / 22 / Lachlan Miller; Coach: / / Craig Fitzgibbon
| 23 July | 19 | Penrith Panthers | BlueBet Stadium, Sydney | Loss | 10-20 | Connor Tracey (7') 1 Matt Moylan (11') 1 | Nicho Hynes 1/1 (12') | | |
Team Details: FB / 1 / William Kennedy; WG / 2 / Connor Tracey; CE / 3 / Jesse Ramien; CE / 4 / Siosifa Talakai; WG / 5 / Ronaldo Mulitalo; FE / 6 / Matt Moylan; HB / 7 / Nicho Hynes; PR / 8 / Toby Rudolf / (substituted off) 26' / (substituted on) 53'; HK / 9 / Blayke Brailey; PR / 10 / Royce Hunt / (substituted off) 17' / (substituted on) 68'; SR / 11 / Briton Nikora; SR / 12 / Wade Graham (c) / (substituted off) 53' / (substituted on) 76'; LK / 13 / Dale Finucane / (substituted off) 34' / (substituted on) 58' / (substituted off) 76'; Interchange: IC / 14 / Teig Wilton / (substituted on) 47'; IC / 15 / Cameron McInnes / (substituted on) 17' / (substituted off) 68'; IC / 16 / Braden Hamlin-Uele / (substituted on) 26' / (substituted off) 47'; IC / 17 / Andrew Fifita / (substituted on) 34' / (substituted off) 58'; Concussion Substitute: RE / 18 / Braydon Trindall; Reserves: RE / 19 / Aiden Tolman; RE / 20 / Kade Dykes; RE / 21 / Jesse Colquhoun; RE / 22 / Matt Ikuvalu; Coach: / / Craig Fitzgibbon
| 30 July | 20 | South Sydney Rabbitohs | PointsBet Stadium, Sydney | Win | 21-20 | Connor Tracey (19') 1 Ronaldo Mulitalo (36') 1 Andrew Fifita (67') 1 | Nicho Hynes 4/4 (20', 31' pen, 38', 68') | Nicho Hynes 1/1 (86'); Matt Moylan 0/2 | |
Team Details: FB / 1 / William Kennedy; WG / 2 / Connor Tracey; CE / 3 / Jesse Ramien; CE / 4 / Siosifa Talakai; WG / 5 / Ronaldo Mulitalo; FE / 6 / Matt Moylan; HB / 7 / Nicho Hynes; PR / 8 / Toby Rudolf / (substituted off) 30' / (substituted on) 54' / (substituted off) 83' / (substituted on) 86'; HK / 9 / Blayke Brailey; PR / 10 / Royce Hunt / (substituted off) 14'; SR / 11 / Briton Nikora; SR / 12 / Wade Graham (c) / (substituted off) 31' / (substituted on) 40' / (substituted off) 48' / (substituted on) 83'; LK / 15 / Cameron McInnes / (substituted off) 40' / (substituted on) 48' / (substituted off) 86'; Interchange: IC / 14 / Teig Wilton / (substituted on) 31'; IC / 16 / Braden Hamlin-Uele / (substituted on) 30' / (substituted off) 51' / (substituted on) 82'; IC / 17 / Andrew Fifita / (substituted on) 51' / (substituted off) 69' / (substituted on) 80' / (substituted off) 82'; IC / 19 / Aiden Tolman / (substituted on) 14' / (substituted off) 54' / (substituted on) 69' / (substituted off) 80'; Concussion Substitute: RE / 18 / Kade Dykes; Reserves: RE / 13 / Dale Finucane; RE / 20 / Braydon Trindall; RE / 21 / Jesse Colquhoun; RE / 22 / Matt Ikuvalu; Coach: / / Craig Fitzgibbon
| 6 August | 21 | St. George Illawarra Dragons | PointsBet Stadium, Sydney | Win | 24-18 | Nicho Hynes (2') 1 Braydon Trindall (24') 1 Teig Wilton (35') 1 Wade Graham (64') 1 | Nicho Hynes 4/4 (3', 26', 36', 65') | | |
Team Details: FB / 1 / Kade Dykes; WG / 2 / Connor Tracey / / (substituted off) 11'; CE / 3 / Jesse Ramien; CE / 4 / Siosifa Talakai / / (substituted off) 76'; WG / 5 / Ronaldo Mulitalo; FE / 14 / Braydon Trindall; HB / 7 / Nicho Hynes; PR / 8 / Toby Rudolf / / (substituted off) 31' / (substituted on) 51'; HK / 9 / Blayke Brailey / (yellow card) 38'; PR / 10 / Braden Hamlin-Uele / / (substituted off) 20' / (substituted on) 67'; SR / 11 / Briton Nikora; SR / 12 / Wade Graham (c) / / (substituted off) 49' / (substituted on) 61'; LK / 13 / Cameron McInnes / / (substituted off) 34' / (substituted on) 49' / (substituted off) 67'; Interchange: IC / 15 / Aiden Tolman / / (substituted on) 20' / (substituted off) 61'; IC / 16 / Teig Wilton / / (substituted on) 34'; IC / 17 / Andrew Fifita / / (substituted on) 31' / (substituted off) 51'; IC / 18 / Lachlan Miller / / (substituted on) 11'; Concussion Substitute: IC / 19 / Jesse Colquhoun / / (substituted on) 76'; Reserves: RE / 6 / Matt Moylan; RE / 20 / Royce Hunt; RE / 21 / Matt Ikuvalu; RE / 22 / Tom Hazelton; Coach: / / Craig Fitzgibbon
| 13 August | 22 | Wests Tigers | Scully Park, Tamworth | Win | 36-12 | Lachlan Miller (5') 1 Matt Ikuvalu (9') 1 Royce Hunt (19') 1 Kade Dykes (21') 1 Braden Hamlin-Uele (52') 1 Jesse Ramien (61') 1 | Nicho Hynes 6/7 (6', 11', 20', 23', 34' pen, 54') | | |
Team Details: FB / 1 / Kade Dykes; WG / 2 / Lachlan Miller / / (substituted off) 66' / (substituted on) 77'; CE / 3 / Jesse Ramien; CE / 22 / Matt Ikuvalu; WG / 5 / Ronaldo Mulitalo; FE / 6 / Braydon Trindall; HB / 7 / Nicho Hynes; PR / 8 / Toby Rudolf / / (substituted off) 27' / (substituted on) 59' / (substituted off) 65'; HK / 9 / Blayke Brailey; PR / 19 / Royce Hunt / / (substituted off) 21' / (substituted on) 65' / (substituted off) 76'; SR / 11 / Briton Nikora; SR / 12 / Wade Graham (c) / / (substituted off) 48' / (substituted on) 66' / (substituted off) 77'; LK / 13 / Dale Finucane / / (substituted off) 32' / (substituted on) 59'; Interchange: IC / 10 / Braden Hamlin-Uele / / (substituted on) 27' / (substituted off) 59' / (substituted on) 76'; IC / 14 / Teig Wilton / (yellow card) 68' / (substituted on) 32'; IC / 15 / Cameron McInnes / / (substituted on) 21'; IC / 21 / Jesse Colquhoun / / (substituted on) 48' / (substituted off) 59'; Concussion Substitute: RE / 18 / Kayal Iro; Reserves: RE / 4 / Siosifa Talakai; RE / 16 / Aiden Tolman; RE / 17 / Andrew Fifita; RE / 20 / Luke Metcalf; Coach: / / Craig Fitzgibbon
| 20 August | 23 | Manly Sea Eagles | 4 Pines Park, Sydney | Win | 40-6 | Nicho Hynes (6', 52') 2 Matt Ikuvalu (38', 71') 2 Royce Hunt (15') 1 Matt Moylan (28') 1 Briton Nikora (55') 1 | Nicho Hynes 6/7 (7', 16', 29', 54', 56', 72') | | |
Team Details: FB / 2 / Lachlan Miller; WG / 20 / Matt Ikuvalu; CE / 3 / Jesse Ramien; CE / 4 / Connor Tracey / (substituted off) 62'; WG / 5 / Ronaldo Mulitalo; FE / 6 / Matt Moylan; HB / 7 / Nicho Hynes; PR / 8 / Braden Hamlin-Uele / (substituted off) 25' / (substituted on) 59'; HK / 9 / Blayke Brailey / (substituted off) 75'; PR / 10 / Royce Hunt / (substituted off) 27' / (substituted on) 62'; SR / 11 / Briton Nikora; SR / 12 / Wade Graham (c); LK / 13 / Dale Finucane / (substituted off) 10' / (substituted on) 68'; Interchange: IC / 15 / Cameron McInnes / (substituted on) 10' / (substituted off) 68' / (substituted on) 75'; IC / 16 / Aiden Tolman / (substituted on) 25' / (substituted off) 62'; IC / 17 / Andrew Fifita / (substituted on) 27' / (substituted off) 59'; IC / 18 / Braydon Trindall / (substituted on) 62'; Concussion Substitute: RE / 22 / Luke Metcalf; Reserves: RE / 1 / Kade Dykes; RE / 14 / Teig Wilton; RE / 19 / Jesse Colquhoun; RE / 21 / Kayal Iro; Coach: / / Craig Fitzgibbon
| 27 August | 24 | Canterbury-Bankstown Bulldogs | PointsBet Stadium, Sydney | Win | 16-0 | Ronaldo Mulitalo (21', 65') 2 Briton Nikora (17') 1 | Nicho Hynes 2/3 (18', 66') | | |
Team Details: FB / 1 / Lachlan Miller; WG / 21 / Kayal Iro; CE / 3 / Jesse Ramien; CE / 4 / Siosifa Talakai; WG / 5 / Ronaldo Mulitalo; FE / 6 / Matt Moylan; HB / 7 / Nicho Hynes; PR / 8 / Braden Hamlin-Uele / (substituted off) 29' / (substituted on) 53' / (substituted off) 68'; HK / 9 / Blayke Brailey; PR / 10 / Royce Hunt / (substituted off) 25' / (substituted on) 65'; SR / 11 / Briton Nikora; SR / 12 / Wade Graham (c) / (substituted off) 50'; LK / 15 / Cameron McInnes / (substituted off) 33' / (substituted on) 50' / (substituted off) 72'; Interchange: IC / 14 / Teig Wilton / (substituted on) 33'; IC / 16 / Aiden Tolman / (substituted on) 25' / (substituted off) 65'; IC / 17 / Andrew Fifita / (substituted on) 29' / (substituted off) 53' / (substituted on) 72'; IC / 18 / Braydon Trindall / (substituted on) 68'; Concussion Substitute: RE / 22 / Luke Metcalf; Reserves: RE / 2 / Matt Ikuvalu; RE / 13 / Dale Finucane; RE / 19 / Jesse Colquhoun; RE / 20 / Franklin Pele; Coach: / / Craig Fitzgibbon
| 4 September | 25 | Newcastle Knights | McDonald Jones Stadium, Newcastle | Win | 38-16 | Briton Nikora (11', 40', 66') 3 Luke Metcalf (29') 1 Ronaldo Mulitalo (47') 1 Jesse Ramien (59') 1 Lachlan Miller (79') 1 | Nicho Hynes 5/6 (12', 31', 41', 48', 67'); Luke Metcalf 0/1 | | |
Team Details: FB / 1 / Lachlan Miller; WG / 2 / Matt Ikuvalu / / (substituted off) 20' / (substituted on) 31'; CE / 3 / Jesse Ramien; CE / 4 / Siosifa Talakai / / (substituted off) 78'; WG / 5 / Ronaldo Mulitalo; FE / 6 / Matt Moylan; HB / 7 / Nicho Hynes / / (substituted off) 72'; PR / 8 / Braden Hamlin-Uele / / (substituted off) 23' / (substituted on) 56'; HK / 9 / Blayke Brailey / (substituted off) 74'; PR / 10 / Royce Hunt / / (substituted off) 26' / (substituted on) 64'; SR / 11 / Briton Nikora; SR / 12 / Wade Graham (c) / / (substituted off) 33' / (substituted on) 65'; LK / 13 / Cameron McInnes / (substituted off) 65' / (substituted on) 74'; Interchange: IC / 14 / Teig Wilton / / (substituted on) 33'; IC / 16 / Aiden Tolman / / (substituted on) 23' / (substituted off) 64'; IC / 17 / Andrew Fifita / / (substituted on) 26' / (substituted off) 56'; IC / 18 / Luke Metcalf / / (substituted on) 20' / (substituted off) 31' / (substituted on) 72'; Concussion Substitute: RE / 19 / Jesse Colquhoun / / (substituted on) 78'; Reserves: RE / 15 / Braydon Trindall; RE / 20 / Mawene Hiroti; RE / 21 / Kayal Iro; RE / 22 / Dale Finucane; RE / 24 / Tom Hazelton; Coach: / / Craig Fitzgibbon
Legend: Win Loss Draw Bye

=== Finals series ===
| Date | Round | Opponent | Venue | Result | Score | Tries | Goals | Field Goals | Report |
|---|---|---|---|---|---|---|---|---|---|
| 10 September | Qualifying Final | North Queensland Cowboys | PointsBet Stadium, Sydney | Loss | 30-32 | William Kennedy (35', 66') 2 Toby Rudolf (10') 1 Siosifa Talakai (24') 1 Cameron McInnes (56') 1 | Nicho Hynes 5/5 (12', 25', 36', 57', 67') | Nicho Hynes 0/1 | |
Team Details: FB / 1 / William Kennedy; WG / 2 / Connor Tracey / (yellow card) 72'; CE / 3 / Jesse Ramien; CE / 4 / Siosifa Talakai; WG / 5 / Ronaldo Mulitalo; FE / 6 / Matt Moylan; HB / 7 / Nicho Hynes; PR / 8 / Toby Rudolf / / (substituted off) 25' / (substituted on) 62' / (substituted off) 83'; HK / 9 / Blayke Brailey; PR / 10 / Royce Hunt / / (substituted off) 20' / (substituted on) 65' / (substituted off) 73' / (substituted on) 83'; SR / 11 / Briton Nikora; SR / 12 / Wade Graham (c) / / (substituted off) 53' / (substituted on) 86'; LK / 13 / Dale Finucane / / (substituted off) 32' / (substituted on) 53' / (substituted off) 86'; Interchange: IC / 14 / Teig Wilton / / (substituted on) 32'; IC / 15 / Cameron McInnes / / (substituted on) 20' / (substituted off) 62' / (substituted on) 73'; IC / 16 / Braden Hamlin-Uele / / (substituted on) 25' / (substituted off) 49'; IC / 17 / Andrew Fifita / / (substituted on) 49' / (substituted off) 65'; Concussion Substitute: RE / 18 / Lachlan Miller; Reserves: RE / 19 / Aiden Tolman; RE / 20 / Matt Ikuvalu; RE / 21 / Jesse Colquhoun; RE / 22 / Luke Metcalf; Coach: / / Craig Fitzgibbon
| 10 September | Semi Final | South Sydney Rabbitohs | Allianz Stadium, Sydney | Loss | 12-38 | Briton Nikora (41') 1 Ronaldo Mulitalo (55') 1 | Nicho Hynes 2/2 (43', 56') | | |
Team Details: FB / 1 / William Kennedy; WG / 2 / Lachlan Miller; CE / 3 / Jesse Ramien; CE / 2 / Connor Tracey; WG / 5 / Ronaldo Mulitalo; FE / 6 / Matt Moylan; HB / 7 / Nicho Hynes; PR / 8 / Toby Rudolf / (substituted off) 30' / (substituted on) 55'; HK / 9 / Blayke Brailey; PR / 16 / Braden Hamlin-Uele / (substituted off) 18' / (substituted on) 64'; SR / 11 / Briton Nikora; SR / 12 / Wade Graham (c) / (substituted off) 33' / (substituted on) 67'; LK / 13 / Dale Finucane / (substituted off) 48' / (substituted on) 72'; Interchange: IC / 14 / Teig Wilton / (substituted on) 33' / (substituted off) 72'; IC / 15 / Cameron McInnes / (substituted on) 18' / (substituted off) 64'; IC / 17 / Andrew Fifita / (substituted on) 48' / (substituted off) 67'; IC / 19 / Aiden Tolman / (substituted on) 30' / (substituted off) 55'; Concussion Substitute: RE / 22 / Mawene Hiroti; Reserves: RE / 4 / Siosifa Talakai; RE / 10 / Royce Hunt; RE / 20 / Braydon Trindall; RE / 21 / Jesse Colquhoun; Coach: / / Craig Fitzgibbon
Legend: Win Loss Draw Bye

== Ladder ==
2022 NRL season
| Pos | Team | Pld | W | D | L | B | PF | PA | PD | Pts |
|---|---|---|---|---|---|---|---|---|---|---|
| 1 | Penrith Panthers (P) | 24 | 20 | 0 | 4 | 1 | 636 | 330 | +306 | 42 |
| 2 | Cronulla-Sutherland Sharks | 24 | 18 | 0 | 6 | 1 | 573 | 364 | +209 | 38 |
| 3 | North Queensland Cowboys | 24 | 17 | 0 | 7 | 1 | 633 | 361 | +272 | 36 |
| 4 | Parramatta Eels | 24 | 16 | 0 | 8 | 1 | 608 | 489 | +119 | 34 |
| 5 | Melbourne Storm | 24 | 15 | 0 | 9 | 1 | 657 | 410 | +247 | 32 |
| 6 | Sydney Roosters | 24 | 15 | 0 | 9 | 1 | 635 | 434 | +201 | 32 |
| 7 | South Sydney Rabbitohs | 24 | 14 | 0 | 10 | 1 | 604 | 474 | +130 | 30 |
| 8 | Canberra Raiders | 24 | 14 | 0 | 10 | 1 | 524 | 461 | +63 | 30 |
| 9 | Brisbane Broncos | 24 | 13 | 0 | 11 | 1 | 514 | 550 | −36 | 28 |
| 10 | St. George Illawarra Dragons | 24 | 12 | 0 | 12 | 1 | 469 | 569 | −100 | 26 |
| 11 | Manly Warringah Sea Eagles | 24 | 9 | 0 | 15 | 1 | 490 | 595 | −105 | 20 |
| 12 | Canterbury-Bankstown Bulldogs | 24 | 7 | 0 | 17 | 1 | 383 | 575 | −192 | 16 |
| 13 | Gold Coast Titans | 24 | 6 | 0 | 18 | 1 | 455 | 660 | −205 | 14 |
| 14 | Newcastle Knights | 24 | 6 | 0 | 18 | 1 | 372 | 662 | −290 | 14 |
| 15 | New Zealand Warriors | 24 | 6 | 0 | 18 | 1 | 408 | 700 | −292 | 14 |
| 16 | Wests Tigers | 24 | 4 | 0 | 20 | 1 | 352 | 679 | −327 | 10 |

=== Ladder progression ===
- Numbers highlighted in green indicate that the team finished the round inside the top eight.
- Numbers highlighted in blue indicate the team finished first on the ladder in that round.
- Numbers highlighted in red indicate the team finished last place on the ladder in that round.
- Underlined numbers indicate that the team had a bye during that round.

| | Team | 1 | 2 | 3 | 4 | 5 | 6 | 7 | 8 | 9 | 10 | 11 | 12 | 13 | 14 | 15 | 16 | 17 | 18 | 19 | 20 | 21 | 22 | 23 | 24 | 25 |
|---|---|---|---|---|---|---|---|---|---|---|---|---|---|---|---|---|---|---|---|---|---|---|---|---|---|---|
| 1 | Penrith Panthers | 2 | 4 | 6 | 8 | 10 | 12 | 14 | 16 | 16 | 18 | 20 | 22 | 24 | 26 | 28 | 30 | 32 | 34 | 36 | 36 | 38 | 38 | 40 | 42 | 42 |
| 2 | Cronulla-Sutherland Sharks | 0 | 2 | 4 | 6 | 8 | 8 | 10 | 10 | 12 | 12 | 14 | 14 | 16 | 18 | 20 | 22 | 24 | 26 | 26 | 28 | 30 | 32 | 34 | 36 | 38 |
| 3 | North Queensland Cowboys | 0 | 2 | 4 | 4 | 4 | 6 | 8 | 10 | 12 | 14 | 16 | 16 | 18 | 20 | 22 | 24 | 26 | 26 | 28 | 30 | 32 | 32 | 34 | 34 | 36 |
| 4 | Parramatta Eels | 2 | 2 | 4 | 6 | 8 | 8 | 10 | 10 | 12 | 12 | 14 | 16 | 18 | 18 | 20 | 20 | 22 | 24 | 24 | 26 | 28 | 28 | 30 | 32 | 34 |
| 5 | Melbourne Storm | 2 | 4 | 4 | 6 | 8 | 10 | 12 | 14 | 16 | 16 | 16 | 18 | 20 | 22 | 24 | 24 | 24 | 24 | 24 | 26 | 28 | 30 | 32 | 32 | 32 |
| 6 | Sydney Roosters | 0 | 2 | 2 | 4 | 6 | 8 | 8 | 8 | 10 | 12 | 12 | 14 | 14 | 14 | 14 | 14 | 16 | 18 | 20 | 22 | 24 | 26 | 28 | 30 | 32 |
| 7 | South Sydney Rabbitohs | 0 | 0 | 2 | 2 | 4 | 6 | 6 | 8 | 8 | 10 | 10 | 12 | 14 | 16 | 16 | 18 | 20 | 22 | 24 | 24 | 26 | 28 | 28 | 30 | 30 |
| 8 | Canberra Raiders | 2 | 2 | 4 | 4 | 4 | 4 | 4 | 4 | 6 | 8 | 10 | 10 | 12 | 12 | 14 | 14 | 16 | 18 | 20 | 22 | 22 | 24 | 26 | 28 | 30 |
| 9 | Brisbane Broncos | 2 | 4 | 4 | 4 | 4 | 4 | 6 | 8 | 10 | 12 | 14 | 16 | 18 | 20 | 20 | 20 | 22 | 24 | 26 | 26 | 26 | 28 | 28 | 28 | 28 |
| 10 | St. George Illawarra Dragons | 2 | 2 | 2 | 2 | 2 | 4 | 6 | 8 | 8 | 8 | 10 | 12 | 14 | 14 | 16 | 18 | 18 | 18 | 20 | 20 | 20 | 20 | 22 | 24 | 26 |
| 11 | Manly Warringah Sea Eagles | 0 | 0 | 2 | 4 | 6 | 8 | 8 | 8 | 10 | 10 | 10 | 10 | 12 | 14 | 14 | 16 | 18 | 20 | 20 | 20 | 20 | 20 | 20 | 20 | 20 |
| 12 | Canterbury-Bankstown Bulldogs | 2 | 2 | 2 | 2 | 2 | 2 | 2 | 4 | 4 | 4 | 4 | 4 | 4 | 6 | 8 | 8 | 10 | 10 | 12 | 14 | 14 | 14 | 14 | 14 | 16 |
| 13 | Gold Coast Titans | 0 | 2 | 2 | 4 | 4 | 4 | 4 | 4 | 4 | 6 | 6 | 6 | 6 | 6 | 6 | 6 | 8 | 8 | 8 | 8 | 8 | 10 | 10 | 12 | 14 |
| 14 | Newcastle Knights | 2 | 4 | 4 | 4 | 4 | 4 | 4 | 4 | 4 | 6 | 6 | 8 | 10 | 10 | 10 | 12 | 12 | 12 | 12 | 12 | 14 | 14 | 14 | 14 | 14 |
| 15 | New Zealand Warriors | 0 | 0 | 2 | 4 | 6 | 6 | 6 | 8 | 8 | 8 | 8 | 8 | 8 | 8 | 8 | 10 | 12 | 12 | 12 | 12 | 12 | 14 | 14 | 14 | 14 |
| 16 | Wests Tigers | 0 | 0 | 0 | 0 | 0 | 2 | 4 | 4 | 4 | 4 | 6 | 6 | 8 | 8 | 8 | 8 | 8 | 8 | 8 | 10 | 10 | 10 | 10 | 10 | 10 |

== Squad ==
| No | Nat | Player | 1st Position | 2nd Position | Age | Height | Weight | NRL Games | Previous 1st Grade Club |
|---|---|---|---|---|---|---|---|---|---|
| 1 | (Australia) | William Kennedy | Fullback | | 25 | 183 | 88 | 43 | None |
| 2 | (Tonga) | Sione Katoa | Wing | | 25 | 180 | 88 | 48 | None |
| 3 | (Australia) | Jesse Ramien | Centre | | 25 | 184 | 98 | 74 | Newcastle Knights |
| 4 | (New Zealand) | Ronaldo Mulitalo | Wing | Centre | 23 | 190 | 95 | 40 | None |
| 5 | (Australia) | Matt Ikuvalu | Wing | Centre | 29 | 184 | 100 | 38 | Sydney Roosters |
| 6 | (Australia) | Matt Moylan | Five-Eighth | | 31 | 185 | 90 | 147 | Penrith Panthers |
| 7 | (Australia) | Nicho Hynes | Halfback | Fullback | 26 | 188 | 90 | 36 | Melbourne Storm |
| 8 | (Australia) | Toby Rudolf | Prop | | 26 | 190 | 106 | 44 | None |
| 9 | (Australia) | Blayke Brailey | Hooker | | 24 | 180 | 86 | 59 | None |
| 10 | (New Zealand) | Braden Hamlin-Uele | Prop | | 27 | 191 | 115 | 63 | North Queensland Cowboys |
| 11 | (New Zealand) | Briton Nikora | Second Row | | 25 | 185 | 94 | 62 | None |
| 12 | (Australia) | Teig Wilton | Second Row | | 23 | 186 | 98 | 20 | None |
| 13 | (Australia) | Dale Finucane | Lock | Prop | 31 | 188 | 106 | 218 | Melbourne Storm |
| 14 | (Australia) | Aiden Tolman | Prop | | 34 | 183 | 102 | 296 | Canterbury-Bankstown Bulldogs |
| 15 | (Australia) | Siosifa Talakai | Centre | Second Row | 25 | 178 | 100 | 42 | South Sydney Rabbitohs |
| 16 | (New Zealand) | Royce Hunt | Prop | Lock | 27 | 192 | 112 | 17 | Canberra Raiders |
| 17 | (Tonga) | Andrew Fifita | Prop | | 33 | 194 | 118 | 229 | Wests Tigers |
| 18 | (Australia) | Connor Tracey | Centre | Wing | 26 | 183 | 87 | 42 | South Sydney Rabbitohs |
| 19 | (Australia) | Cameron McInnes | Lock | Second Row | 28 | 177 | 91 | 130 | St. George Illawarra Dragons |
| 20 | (Australia) | Braydon Trindall | Halfback | Five-Eighth | 23 | 180 | 90 | 23 | None |
| 21 | (New Zealand) | Jack Williams | Lock | | 26 | 184 | 98 | 69 | None |
| 22 | (New Zealand) | Mawene Hiroti | Centre | Wing | 23 | 187 | 95 | 21 | South Sydney Rabbitohs |
| 23 | (Australia) | Wade Graham (c) | Second Row | | 32 | 186 | 106 | 259 | Penrith Panthers |
| 24 | (Australia) | Lachlan Miller | Fullback | Wing | 28 | 180 | 84 | 0 | Australia Sevens |
| 25 | (Australia) | Tom Hazelton; Extended squad | Prop | | 23 | 198 | 114 | 0 | None |
| 26 | (Australia) | Jesse Colquhoun; Extended squad | Prop | Second Row | 21 | 190 | 105 | 0 | None |
| 27 | (Australia) | Kade Dykes | Fullback | Five-Eighth | 20 | ??? | ?? | 0 | None |
| 28 | (Cook Islands) | Kayal Iro | Centre | Wing | 22 | 185 | 94 | 0 | None |
| 29 | (Australia) | Luke Metcalf | Five-Eighth | Halfback | 23 | 183 | 86 | 6 | None |
| | (Australia) | Jayden Berrell | Hooker | | 27 | 177 | 87 | 0 | None |
| | (Australia) | Jonaiah Lualua; Development player | Wing | | 22 | ??? | ?? | 0 | None |
| | (Australia) | Jack Martin; Development player | Prop | | 20 | ??? | ?? | 0 | None |
| | (New Zealand) | Franklin Pele | Prop | | 22 | 191 | 121 | 1 | None |
| | (Australia) | Ryan Rivett; Development player | Halfback | | 20 | ??? | ?? | 0 | None |
| | (Australia) | Tom Rodwell; Development player | Wing | Second Row | 21 | ??? | ?? | 0 | None |
| | (New Zealand) | Jensen Taumoepeau | Centre | Wing | 22 | 190 | 102 | 0 | None |

== Player movements ==
=== Recruited ===
| Nat | Pos | Player | From | Date | Ref |
|---|---|---|---|---|---|
| (Australia) | L | Cameron McInnes | St. George Illawarra Dragons | February 2021 | |
| (Australia) | HB | Nicho Hynes | Melbourne Storm | June 2021 | |
| (Australia) | W | Matt Ikuvalu | Sydney Roosters | November 2021 | |
| (Australia) | H | Jayden Berrell | Wynnum Manly Seagulls | November 2021 | |
| (Australia) | FB | Lachlan Miller | Australia Sevens | November 2021 | |
| (Cook Islands) | C | Kayal Iro | Newtown Jets | July 2022; Mid-season transfer | |

=== Released ===
| Nat | Pos | Player | To | Date | Ref |
|---|---|---|---|---|---|
| (Australia) | C | Josh Dugan | Retirement | September 2021 | |
| (Australia) | PR | Aaron Woods | St. George Illawarra Dragons | October 2021 | |
| (Australia) | C | Will Chambers | LA Giltinis | October 2021 | |
| (Greece) | L | Billy Magoulias | Warrington Wolves | October 2021 | |
| (New Zealand) | C | Jackson Ferris | Newtown Jets | January 2022 | |
| (Australia) | SR | Kai O'Donnell | Burleigh Bears | February 2022 | |
| (Australia) | H | Kyle Paterson | Redcliffe Dolphins | March 2022 | |
| (Australia) | HB | Jack A Williams | Parramatta Eels | March 2022 | |
| (Australia) | PR | Daniel Vasquez | Released | Undisclosed | |

== Player appearances ==
| FB=Fullback | W=Winger | C=Centre | FE=Five-Eighth | HB=Halfback | PR=Prop | H=Hooker | SR=Second Row | L=Lock | B=Bench | R=Reserve |

| No | Player | 1 | 2 | 3 | 4 | 5 | 6 | 7 | 8 | 9 | 10 | 11 | 12 | 13 | 14 | 15 | 16 | 17 | 18 | 19 | 20 | 21 | 22 | 23 | 24 | 25 | QF | SF |
|---|---|---|---|---|---|---|---|---|---|---|---|---|---|---|---|---|---|---|---|---|---|---|---|---|---|---|---|---|
| 1 | Jayden Berrell | H (NSW) | R | | | | | H (NSW) | H (NSW) | H (NSW) | R | H (NSW) | H (NSW) | H (NSW) | H (NSW) | H (NSW) | H (NSW) | H (NSW) | H (NSW) | H (NSW) | R (NSW) | H (NSW) | – | H (NSW) | H (NSW) | – | – | H (NSW) |
| 2 | Blayke Brailey | H | H | H | H | H | H | H | H | H | H | H | H | – | H | H | H | H | H | H | H | H | H | H | H | H | H | H |
| 3 | Kade Dykes | Prior to his promotion into the top 30 squad, Dykes was a member of the Sharks' development list.| | | | | | | | | | | | | | | | | | | | | FB | FB | R (Note: Was initially named in the starting lineup but was ruled out due to injury.) | | | FB (NSW) | R |
| 4 | Andrew Fifita | B | B | B | B | B | B | B | R | B | R | B | B | – | B | R | B | PR | B | B | B | B | R | B | B | B | B | B |
| 5 | Dale Finucane | L | L | L | L | L | L | | R | PR | PR | | | | | B | L | L | L | L | Red card | Red card | L | L | R | R | L | L |
| 6 | Wade Graham | | | | | | | | B | B | B | SR | R | – | SR | SR | SR | SR | SR | SR | SR | SR | SR | SR | SR | SR | SR | SR |
| 7 | Braden Hamlin-Uele | PR | PR | PR | PR | PR | PR | | | | | | | | | | | B | B | B | B | PR | B | PR | PR | PR | B | PR |
| 8 | Mawene Hiroti | – | – | W (NSW) | C (NSW) | R | W | C (NSW) | R | R | B | FB (NSW) | C (NSW) | C (NSW) | C (NSW) | R (NSW) | C (NSW) | C (NSW) | – | C (NSW) | C (NSW) | C (NSW) | – | C (NSW) | FB (NSW) | R | C (NSW) | R |
| 9 | Royce Hunt | B | L (NSW) | PR (NSW) | PR (NSW) | B | R | PR | PR | R | B | PR | PR | – | PR | PR | PR | PR | PR | PR | PR | R | PR | PR | PR | PR | PR | R |
| 10 | Nicho Hynes | HB | HB | HB | HB | HB | HB | HB | HB | HB | FB | HB | HB | – | HB | HB | HB | R (Note: Was initially named in the starting lineup but was ruled out due to COVID protocols.) | HB | HB | HB | HB | HB | HB | HB | HB | HB | HB |
| 11 | Matt Ikuvalu | W | R | W | | | | W (NSW) | C (NSW) | R | | | | | | | W (NSW) | W (NSW) | R (NSW) | W (NSW) | W (NSW) | W (NSW) | C | W | R | W | W (NSW) | |
| 12 | Kayal Iro | Prior to his promotion into the top 30 squad, Iro was a member of the Sharks' feeder club, the Newtown Jets. | | | | | | | | | | | | | | | | | | C (NSW) | C (NSW) | FB (NSW) | R | FB (NSW) | W | R | C (NSW) | C (NSW) |
| 13 | Sione Katoa | W | W | W | W | W | R | W | W | W | W | W | W | – | W | W | W | W | W | | | | | | | | | |
| 14 | William Kennedy | FB | FB | FB | FB | FB | FB | FB | FB | FB | Red card | Red card | FB | – | FB | FB | FB | FB | FB | FB | FB | | | | | | FB | FB |
| 15 | Cameron McInnes | | B | B | B | B | SR | L | L | L | L | L | L | – | L | L | B | B | B | B | L | L | B | B | L | L | B | B |
| 16 | Luke Metcalf | FE (NSW) | FE (NSW) | FE (NSW) | FE (NSW) | | | | HB (NSW) | FE (NSW) | R | R | R | HB (NSW) | HB (NSW) | HB (NSW) | – | R (NSW) | – | – | FE (NSW) | FE (NSW) | R | FE (NSW) | R | B | HB (NSW) | R (NSW) |
| 17 | Lachlan Miller | FB (NSW) | FB (NSW) | FB (NSW) | FB (NSW) | FE (NSW) | R | FE (NSW) | FE (NSW) | | R | FB | FB (NSW) | FB (NSW) | FB (NSW) | FB (NSW) | FB (NSW) | FB (NSW) | FE (NSW) | FE (NSW) | FB (NSW) | B | W | FB | FB | FB | R | W |
| 18 | Matt Moylan | FE | FE | FE | FE | FE | FE | FE | FE | FE | FE | FE | FE | – | FE | FE | FE | FE | FE | FE | FE | R | | FE | FE | FE | FE | FE |
| 19 | Ronaldo Mulitalo | C | W | | W | W | W | W | W | R (Note: Was initially named in the starting lineup but was ruled out due to illness.) | W | W | W | – | W | W | W | W | W | W | W | W | W | W | W | W | W | W |
| 20 | Briton Nikora | SR | SR | SR | SR | SR | R | SR | SR | SR | SR | SR | SR | – | SR | SR | SR | SR | Red card | SR | SR | SR | SR | SR | SR | SR | SR | SR |
| 21 | Franklin Pele | Red card | B (NSW) | B (NSW) | B (NSW) | PR (NSW) | PR (NSW) | PR (NSW) | PR (NSW) | B (NSW) | | | B (NSW) | PR (NSW) | PR (NSW) | PR (NSW) | – | B (NSW) | – | B (NSW) | B (NSW) | B (NSW) | – | B (NSW) | B (NSW) | – | B (NSW) | B (NSW) |
| 22 | Jesse Ramien | C | C | C | C | C | C | C | C | C | Red card | Red card | Red card | – | C | C | C | C | C | C | C | C | C | C | C | C | C | C |
| 23 | Toby Rudolf | PR | PR | PR | PR | PR | PR | PR | PR | PR | PR | PR | PR | – | PR | PR | PR | R | PR | PR | PR | PR | PR | | | | PR | PR |
| 24 | Siosifa Talakai | B | B | SR | C | C | C | C | C | C | C | C | C | – | C | C | C | – | R | C | C | C | R | | C | C | C | R |
| 25 | Jensen Taumoepeau | C (NSW) | C (NSW) | C (NSW) | C (NSW) | | | | | | | W (NSW) | W (NSW) | C (NSW) | W (NSW) | W (NSW) | R (NSW) | B (NSW) | C (NSW) | B (NSW) | B (NSW) | W (NSW) | – | W (NSW) | W (NSW) | – | W (NSW) | W (NSW) |
| 26 | Aiden Tolman | B | B | B | B | R | B | B | B | B | B | B | B | – | B | B | B | B | R | R | B | B | R | B | B | B | R | B |
| 27 | Connor Tracey | | C | C | | | | | | W | C | C | C | – | R | R | R | C | C | W | W | W | | C | | | W | C |
| 28 | Braydon Trindall | Red card | Red card | B | B | HB (NSW) | B | B | B | HB (NSW) | HB | B | B | – | B | B | HB (NSW) | HB | R | R | HB (NSW) | FE | FE | B | B | R | | HB (NSW) |
| 29 | Jack Williams | | | L (NSW) | L (NSW) | B | B | B | B | B | B | | | | | | | | | | | | | | | | | |
| 30 | Teig Wilton | SR | SR | Red card | SR | SR | SR | SR | SR | SR | SR | B | SR | – | B | B | B | B | SR | B | B | B | B | R | B | B | B | B |
Development Players
| 31 | Kade Dykes | FB (JFC) | FB (JFC) | FB (JFC) | FB (JFC) | FB (NSW) | FE (NSW) | FB (NSW) | FB (NSW) | FB (NSW) | – | R | HB (NSW) | FE (NSW) | FE (NSW) | FE (NSW) | FE (NSW) | FE (NSW) | FB (NSW) | FB (NSW) | R | On 2 August, Dykes was promoted into the Sharks top 30 upon re-signing with the club. | | | | | | |
| 32 | Jonaiah Lualua | R | W (NSW) | W (NSW) | W (NSW) | W (NSW) | W (NSW) | W (NSW) | W (NSW) | W (NSW) | – | W (NSW) | W (NSW) | R (NSW) | – | W (NSW) | – | – | W (NSW) | R (NSW) | – | – | – | – | – | – | – | – |
| 33 | Jack Martin | PR (JFC) | PR (JFC) | PR (JFC) | PR (JFC) | PR (JFC) | B (NSW) | B (NSW) | PR (JFC) | PR (JFC) | – | PR (JFC) | PR (JFC) | PR (JFC) | PR (JFC) | PR (JFC) | | | | | PR (JFC) | B (JFC) | – | PR (JFC) | PR (JFC) | – | – | – |
| 34 | Ryan Rivett | HB (JFC) | HB (JFC) | HB (JFC) | HB (JFC) | HB (JFC) | HB (JFC) | HB (JFC) | HB (JFC) | HB (JFC) | – | HB (JFC) | HB (JFC) | HB (JFC) | HB (JFC) | HB (JFC) | HB (JFC) | HB (JFC) | HB (JFC) | R (JFC) | HB (JFC) | HB (JFC) | – | HB (NSW) | HB (JFC) | – | – | – |
| 35 | Tom Rodwell | On 5 August, Rodwell was promoted to the Sharks' development list from their Jersey Flegg squad following Kade Dykes' promotion into the Top 30.| | | | | | | | | | | | | | | | | | | | | WG (JFC) | – | WG (JFC) | WG (JFC) | – | – | W (NSW) |
Extended Squad (Note: Only includes those outside of Top 30 and Development Players that have been named in first grade team lists.)
| 34 | Jesse Colquhoun | B (NSW) | R (NSW) | SR (NSW) | – | – | – | SR (NSW) | PR (NSW) | SR (NSW) | R | PR (NSW) | PR (NSW) | B (NSW) | R | SR (NSW) | PR (NSW) | PR (NSW) | B | PR (NSW) | PR (NSW) | B PR (NSW) | B | PR (NSW) | L (NSW) | B | L (NSW) | B (NSW) |
| 35 | Tom Hazelton | PR (NSW) | PR (NSW) | B (NSW) | B (NSW) | PR (NSW) | PR (NSW) | PR (NSW) | R (NSW) | PR (NSW) | R | R | B | PR (NSW) | R | PR (NSW) | PR (NSW) | PR (NSW) | PR (NSW) | PR (NSW) | PR (NSW) | PR (NSW) | – | PR (NSW) | PR (NSW) | R | PR (NSW) | PR (NSW) |
| 36 | Kayal Iro | C (NSW) | C (NSW) | C (NSW) | W (NSW) | W (NSW) | C (NSW) | C (NSW) | SR (NSW) | C (NSW) | – | C (NSW) | C (NSW) | – | C (NSW) | C (NSW) | C (NSW) | C (NSW) | C (NSW) | On 20 July, Iro was promoted into the Sharks top 30 for the remainder of the season. | | | | | | | | |

== Representative honours ==
| Pos. | Player | Team | Call-up | References |
First Grade
| PR | Andrew Fifita | Indigenous All Stars | 2022 All Stars Match | |
| RE | Andrew Fifita | Tonga | 2022 Pacific Tests | |
| RE | Dale Finucane | New South Wales Origin | 2022 State of Origin Game III | |
| PR | Braden Hamlin-Uele | Samoa | 2021 Rugby League World Cup | |
| RE | Jed Hardy | Malta | 2022 Elias-Fenech Shield | |
| BE | Royce Hunt | (Māori people) Maori All Stars | 2022 All Stars Match | |
| BE | Royce Hunt | Samoa | 2021 Rugby League World Cup | |
| FE | Nicho Hynes | Indigenous All Stars | 2022 All Stars Match | |
| RE | Nicho Hynes | New South Wales Origin | 2022 State of Origin Game I | |
| RE | Nicho Hynes | New South Wales Origin | 2022 State of Origin Game II | |
| RE | Nicho Hynes | Australia | 2021 Rugby League World Cup | |
| CE | Kayal Iro | Cook Islands | 2022 Pacific Tests | |
| WG | Sione Katoa | Tonga | 2022 Pacific Tests | |
| WG | Sione Katoa | Tonga | 2021 Rugby League World Cup | |
| FB | William Kennedy | Indigenous All Stars | 2022 All Stars Match | |
| WG | Ronaldo Mulitalo | New Zealand | 2022 Pacific Tests | |
| WG | Ronaldo Mulitalo | New Zealand | 2021 Rugby League World Cup | |
| SR | Briton Nikora | (Māori people) Maori All Stars | 2022 All Stars Match | |
| BE | Briton Nikora | New Zealand | 2022 Pacific Tests | |
| SR | Briton Nikora | New Zealand | 2021 Rugby League World Cup | |
| WG | Kyle Pickering | Italy | 2021 Rugby League World Cup | |
| CE | Jesse Ramien | Indigenous All Stars | 2022 All Stars Match | |
| BE | Siosifa Talakai | New South Wales Origin | 2022 State of Origin Game II | |
| BE | Siosifa Talakai | New South Wales Origin | 2022 State of Origin Game III | |
| CE | Siosifa Talakai | Tonga | 2021 Rugby League World Cup | |
| WG | Siteni Taukamo | Greece | 2021 Rugby League World Cup | |
| HB | Braydon Trindall | Indigenous All Stars | 2022 All Stars Match | |
Women's
| BE | Brooke Anderson | City Women's | 2022 Country vs City Open Women's | |
| CE | Corban Baxter | (Māori people) Maori All Stars | 2022 Women's All Stars Match | |
| RE | Corban Baxter | New South Wales Women | 2022 Women's State of Origin | |
| WG | Teagan Berry | Country Women's | 2022 Country vs City Open Women's | |
| RE | Teagan Berry | New South Wales Women | 2022 Women's State of Origin | |
| FB | Sam Bremner | Country Women's | 2022 Country vs City Open Women's | |
| RE | Sam Bremner | New South Wales Women | 2022 Women's State of Origin | |
| FB | Sam Bremner | Harvey Norman Jillaroos | 2021 Women's Rugby League World Cup | |
| LK | Kennedy Cherrington | (Māori people) Maori All Stars | 2022 Women's All Stars Match | |
| LK | Kennedy Cherrington | City Women's | 2022 Country vs City Open Women's | |
| BE | Kennedy Cherrington | Harvey Norman Jillaroos | 2021 Women's Rugby League World Cup | |
| HK | Rueben Cherrington | New South Wales Women Under 19s | 2022 Women's State of Origin Under 19s | |
| HK | Quincy Dodd | Indigenous All Stars | 2022 Women's All Stars Match | |
| BE | Quincy Dodd | New South Wales Women | 2022 Women's State of Origin | |
| SR | Talei Holmes | City Women's | 2022 Country vs City Open Women's | |
| RE | Talei Holmes | New South Wales Women | 2022 Women's State of Origin | |
| WG | Tiana Penitani | New South Wales Women | 2022 Women's State of Origin | |
| CE | Andie Robinson | City Women's | 2022 Country vs City Open Women's | |
| CE | Andie Robinson | New South Wales Women Under 19s | 2022 Women's State of Origin Under 19s | |
| PR | Monalisa Soliola | New South Wales Women Under 19s | 2022 Women's State of Origin Under 19s | |
| HB | Maddie Studdon | City Women's | 2022 Country vs City Open Women's | |
| WG | Leianne Tufuga | City Women's | 2022 Country vs City Open Women's | |
| BE | Holli Wheeler | Harvey Norman Jillaroos | 2021 Women's Rugby League World Cup | |
Under 18s
| HK | Taj Brailey | City Under 18s | 2022 Country vs City Under 18s | |
| PR | Sam McCulloch | City Under 18s | 2022 Country vs City Under 18s | |
| RE | Chevy Stewart | City Under 18s | 2022 Country vs City Under 18s | |
| WG | Chevy Stewart | Australian Schoolboys | Australian Secondary Schools Rugby League tour | |
| RE | Siteni Taukamo | City Under 18s | 2022 Country vs City Under 18s | |
Under 16s
| LK | Alex Challenor | City Under 16s | 2022 Country vs City Under 16s | |
Wheelchair
| N/A | Liam Luff | Australia | 2021 Rugby League World Cup | |
| N/A | Jessi Mowczan | City Wheelchair Rugby League | 2022 Country vs City Wheelchair Rugby League | |

== Squad statistics ==
| Name | Start | Int | T | G | FG | Pts |
|---|---|---|---|---|---|---|
| Blayke Brailey | 26 | 0 | 3 | 0 | 0 | 12 |
| Jesse Colquhoun | 0 | 4 | 0 | 0 | 0 | 0 |
| Kade Dykes | 2 | 0 | 1 | 0 | 0 | 4 |
| Andrew Fifita | 1 | 21 | 1 | 0 | 0 | 4 |
| Dale Finucane | 16 | 1 | 0 | 0 | 0 | 0 |
| Wade Graham | 15 | 3 | 1 | 0 | 0 | 4 |
| Braden Hamlin-Uele | 11 | 6 | 2 | 0 | 0 | 8 |
| Tom Hazelton | 0 | 1 | 0 | 0 | 0 | 0 |
| Mawene Hiroti | 1 | 1 | 0 | 0 | 0 | 0 |
| Royce Hunt | 16 | 3 | 3 | 0 | 0 | 12 |
| Nicho Hynes | 25 | 0 | 6 | 83 | 4 | 194 |
| Matt Ikuvalu | 5 | 0 | 4 | 0 | 0 | 16 |
| Kayal Iro | 1 | 0 | 0 | 0 | 0 | 0 |
| Sione Katoa | 16 | 0 | 14 | 0 | 0 | 56 |
| William Kennedy | 19 | 0 | 7 | 0 | 0 | 28 |
| Cameron McInnes | 13 | 12 | 2 | 0 | 0 | 8 |
| Luke Metcalf | 0 | 1 | 1 | 0 | 0 | 4 |
| Lachlan Miller | 6 | 1 | 3 | 0 | 0 | 12 |
| Matt Moylan | 24 | 0 | 5 | 0 | 1 | 21 |
| Ronaldo Mulitalo | 24 | 0 | 17 | 0 | 0 | 68 |
| Briton Nikora | 24 | 0 | 8 | 0 | 0 | 32 |
| Jesse Ramien | 23 | 0 | 10 | 0 | 0 | 40 |
| Toby Rudolf | 22 | 0 | 1 | 0 | 0 | 4 |
| Siosifa Talakai | 19 | 2 | 7 | 0 | 0 | 28 |
| Aiden Tolman | 0 | 21 | 1 | 0 | 0 | 4 |
| Connor Tracey | 14 | 0 | 6 | 0 | 0 | 24 |
| Braydon Trindall | 4 | 11 | 1 | 2 | 0 | 8 |
| Jack Williams | 0 | 6 | 0 | 0 | 0 | 0 |
| Teig Wilton | 11 | 13 | 6 | 0 | 0 | 24 |
| 29 Players used | — | — | 110 | 85 | 5 | 615 |

== NSWRL Major Comps ==
=== Knock-On Effect NSW Cup (Newtown Jets) ===
==== Pre-season ====
2022 Newtown Jets pre-season game log: 0–1–1 (Home: 0–1–1; Away: 0–0–0)
| Date | Round | Opponent | Venue | Result | Score | Tries | Goals | Field Goals | Report |
|---|---|---|---|---|---|---|---|---|---|
| 12 February | Trial Match | Mount Pritchard Mounties | Henson Park, Sydney | Loss | 4-8 | Devon Makoiare-Boyce (23') 1 | (Note: Match played in three twenty-minute sessions with no goal-kicking to be taken.) | | |
Team Details: FB / 1 / Dylan O'Connor; WG / 2 / Jonah Ngaronoa; CE / 3 / James Coyne; CE / 4 / Jarrod Cullen; WG / 5 / Johnathan Tufuga; FE / 6 / Rhys Davies; HB / 7 / Angus Ernst; PR / 8 / Caleb Hamlin-Uele; HK / 9 / Zac Woolford; PR / 10 / Kurt Dillon (c); SR / 11 / Charbel Tasipale; SR / 12 / Reubenn Rennie; LK / 13 / Tyler Slade; Interchange: IC / 14 / Vincent Rennie; IC / 15 / Josh Rudolph; IC / 16 / Reid Alchin; IC / 17 / Isaac Longmuir; IC / 18 / Eli Levido; IC / 19 / Devon Makoiare-Boyce; Coach: / / Greg Matterson
| 28 February | Trial Match | Canterbury-Bankstown Bulldogs | Sharks Academy Fields, Sydney (Note: Match was originally set to take place at PointsBet Stadium.) | Draw | 12-12 | Reubenn Rennie (40') 1 Jonaiah Lualua (72') 1 | Lachlan Miller 1/1 (40'); Eli Levido 1/1 (74') | | |
Team Details: FB / 1 / Lachlan Miller; WG / 2 / Zac Cini; CE / 3 / Jensen Taumoepeau; CE / 4 / Kayal Iro; WG / 5 / Jonaiah Lualua; FE / 6 / Angus Ernst; HB / 7 / Rhys Davies; PR / 8 / Vincent Rennie; HK / 9 / Jayden Berrell; PR / 10 / Kurt Dillon (c); SR / 11 / Charbel Tasipale; SR / 12 / Reubenn Rennie; LK / 13 / Tyler Slade; Interchange: IC / 14 / Dylan O'Connor; IC / 15 / Kade Dykes; IC / 16 / Jonah Ngaronoa; IC / 17 / Eli Levido; IC / 18 / Tyla Tamou; IC / 19 / Reid Alchin; IC / 20 / Liam Harris; IC / 21 / Caleb Hamlin-Uele; IC / 22 / Zac Woolford; IC / 23 / Isaac Longmuir; Coach: / / Greg Matterson
Legend: Win Loss Draw Bye

==== Regular season ====
2022 Newtown Jets regular season game log: 16–2–4 (Home: 9–1–1; Away: 7–1–3)
| Date | Round | Opponent | Venue | Result | Score | Tries | Goals | Field Goals | Report |
|---|---|---|---|---|---|---|---|---|---|
| 12 March | 1 | Canberra Raiders | Henson Park, Sydney | Win | 36-22 | Luke Metcalf (1') 1 Jayden Berrell (13') 1 Charbel Tasipale (31') 1 Myles Taueli (35') 1 Lachlan Miller (51') 1 Tyla Tamou (69') 1 | Luke Metcalf 6/7 (3', 15', 33', 38', 53', 71') | | |
Team Details: FB / 1 / Lachlan Miller; WG / 2 / Tyla Tamou; CE / 3 / Jensen Taumoepeau; CE / 4 / Kayal Iro; WG / 22 / Sam Stonestreet; FE / 18 / Luke Metcalf; HB / 7 / Rhys Davies; PR / 8 / Tom Hazelton / (substituted off) 23' / (substituted on) 60' / (substituted off) 66'; HK / 9 / Jayden Berrell / (substituted off) 60'; PR / 10 / Kurt Dillon (c) / (substituted off) 30' / (substituted on) 65'; SR / 11 / Myles Taueli / (substituted off) 75'; SR / 12 / Reubenn Rennie; LK / 13 / Tyler Slade / (substituted off) 50' / (substituted on) 66'; Interchange: IC / 14 / Charbel Tasipale / (substituted on) 30' / (substituted off) 65' / (substituted on) 75'; IC / 15 / Zac Woolford / (substituted on) 50'; IC / 17 / Vincent Rennie / (substituted on) 65'; IC / 20 / Jesse Colquhoun / (substituted on) 23' / (substituted off) 65'; Concussion Substitute: RE / 16 / Jonah Ngaronoa; Reserves: RE / 5 / Jonaiah Lualua; RE / 6 / Angus Ernst; RE / 21 / Caleb Hamlin-Uele; Coach: / / Greg Matterson
| 20 March (Note: Originally scheduled for 19 March.) | 2 | Parramatta Eels | Kellyville Park, Kellyville | Win | 28-24 | Jonaiah Lualua (40', 66') 2 Luke Metcalf (16') 1 Rhys Davies (22') 1 Kayal Iro (59') 1 | Luke Metcalf 4/5 (18', 24', 61', 77' pen) | | |
Team Details: FB / 1 / Lachlan Miller; WG / 2 / Jonaiah Lualua; CE / 3 / Jensen Taumoepeau; CE / 4 / Kayal Iro; WG / 5 / Tyla Tamou; FE / 18 / Luke Metcalf; HB / 7 / Rhys Davies; PR / 8 / Tom Hazelton / (substituted off) 21' / (substituted on) 52'; HK / 13 / Tyler Slade / (substituted off) 56'; PR / 10 / Kurt Dillon (c) / (substituted off) 52'; SR / 11 / Myles Taueli / (substituted off) 28'; SR / 12 / Reubenn Rennie; LK / 23 / Royce Hunt / (substituted off) 24' / (substituted on) 52'; Interchange: IC / 14 / Charbel Tasipale / (substituted on) 28'; IC / 15 / Zac Woolford / (substituted on) 21'; IC / 17 / Franklin Pele / (substituted on) 24' / (substituted off) 52'; IC / 21 / Vincent Rennie / (substituted on) 56'; Concussion Substitute: RE / 22 / Addison Demetriou; Reserves: RE / 6 / Angus Ernst; RE / 9 / Jayden Berrell; RE / 16 / Jonah Ngaronoa; RE / 20 / Jesse Colquhoun; Coach: / / Greg Matterson
| 26 March | 3 | St. George Illawarra Dragons | Kirkham Oval, Camden (Note: Match was originally set to take place at Collegians Sporting Complex.) | Win | 50-10 | Luke Metcalf (7', 40', 63') 3 Kayal Iro (25', 40') 2 Reubenn Rennie (3') 1 Jonaiah Lualua (9') 1 Tom Hazelton (46') 1 Mawene Hiroti (52') 1 | Luke Metcalf 7/10 (5', 8', 40', 40' pen, 48', 54', 65') | | |
Team Details: FB / 1 / Lachlan Miller; WG / 2 / Jonaiah Lualua; CE / 3 / Jensen Taumoepeau; CE / 4 / Kayal Iro; WG / 5 / Mawene Hiroti; FE / 18 / Luke Metcalf; HB / 7 / Rhys Davies; PR / 23 / Royce Hunt / (substituted off) 26' / (substituted on) 47'; HK / 9 / Tyler Slade / (substituted off) 21' / (substituted on) 53'; PR / 10 / Kurt Dillon (c) / (substituted off) 21' / (substituted on) 59'; SR / 11 / Jesse Colquhoun / (substituted off) 61'; SR / 12 / Reubenn Rennie; LK / 16 / Jack Williams / (substituted off) 47'; Interchange: IC / 8 / Tom Hazelton / (substituted on) 21' / (substituted off) 48'; IC / 13 / Franklin Pele / (substituted on) 26' / (substituted off) 59'; IC / 15 / Zac Woolford / (substituted on) 21' / (substituted off) 53' / (substituted on) 61'; IC / 21 / Vincent Rennie / (substituted on) 48'; Concussion Substitute: RE / 6 / Tyla Tamou; Reserves: RE / 14 / Charbel Tasipale; RE / 19 / Addison Demetriou; RE / 24 / Jonah Ngaronoa; Coach: / / Greg Matterson
| 2 April | 4 | Newcastle Knights | Leichhardt Oval, Sydney (Note: Match was originally set to take place at Campbelltown Sports Stadium.) | Win | 18-16 | Mawene Hiroti (10') 1 Reubenn Rennie (33') 1 Franklin Pele (49') 1 | Luke Metcalf 3/3 (11', 35', 51') | | |
Team Details: FB / 1 / Lachlan Miller; WG / 2 / Jonaiah Lualua; CE / 15 / Mawene Hiroti; CE / 4 / Jensen Taumoepeau; WG / 5 / Kayal Iro; FE / 18 / Luke Metcalf; HB / 7 / Rhys Davies; PR / 23 / Royce Hunt / / (substituted off) 22' / (substituted on) 60'; HK / 13 / Tyler Slade / / (substituted off) 23' / (substituted on) 40'; PR / 10 / Kurt Dillon (c) / / (substituted off) 25' / (substituted on) 60'; SR / 11 / Charbel Tasipale; SR / 12 / Reubenn Rennie / / (substituted off) 40'; LK / 22 / Jack Williams / / (substituted off) 61' / (substituted on) 76'; Interchange: IC / 8 / Tom Hazelton / / (substituted on) 22' / (substituted off) 60'; IC / 9 / Zac Woolford / / (substituted on) 23'; IC / 17 / Franklin Pele / (yellow card) 28' / (substituted on) 25' / (substituted off) 60'; IC / 21 / Vincent Rennie / / (substituted on) 61' / (substituted off) 76'; Concussion Substitute: RE / 19 / Addison Demetriou; Reserves: RE / 3 / Tyla Tamou; RE / 6 / Angus Ernst; RE / 22 / Dylan O'Connor; RE / 23 / Caleb Hamlin-Uele; Coach: / / Greg Matterson
| 9 April | 5 | Western Suburbs Magpies | Henson Park, Sydney | Win | 40-10 | Addison Demetriou (21', 66', 77') 3 Reubenn Rennie (11') 1 Kade Dykes (41') 1 Tyla Tamou (51') 1 Braydon Trindall (73') 1 | Braydon Trindall 3/4 (13', 22', 43'); Lachlan Miller 3/3 (68', 75', 79') | | |
Team Details: FB / 1 / Kade Dykes; WG / 2 / Jonaiah Lualua; CE / 3 / Addison Demetriou; CE / 4 / Jensen Taumoepeau; WG / 5 / Kayal Iro / (substituted off) 75'; FE / 6 / Lachlan Miller; HB / 15 / Braydon Trindall (c); PR / 8 / Tom Hazelton / (substituted off) 26' / (substituted on) 48'; HK / 7 / Rhys Davies / (substituted off) 29' / (substituted on) 68'; PR / 17 / Franklin Pele / (substituted off) 23' / (substituted on) 61'; SR / 11 / Charbel Tasipale; SR / 12 / Reubenn Rennie / (substituted off) 65'; LK / 13 / Tyler Slade; Interchange: IC / 9 / Zac Woolford / (substituted on) 29' / (substituted off) 68' / (substituted on) 75'; IC / 10 / Kurt Dillon / (substituted on) 23' / (substituted off) 48'; IC / 19 / Ethan Natoli / (substituted on) 65'; IC / 21 / Vincent Rennie / (substituted on) 26' / (substituted off) 61'; Concussion Substitute: RE / 22 / Johnathan Tufuga; Reserves: RE / 14 / Jonah Ngaronoa; RE / 22 / Dylan O'Connor; RE / 23 / Caleb Hamlin-Uele; Coach: / / Greg Matterson
| 15 April | 6 | South Sydney Rabbitohs | Accor Stadium, Sydney | Loss | 10-32 | Kade Dykes (15') 1 Kayal Iro (48') 1 | Addison Demetriou 1/2 (17') | | |
Team Details: FB / 19 / Dylan O'Connor / (yellow card) 62'; WG / 2 / Jonaiah Lualua; CE / 3 / Addison Demetriou; CE / 4 / Kayal Iro; WG / 22 / Sam Stonestreet; FE / 1 / Kade Dykes; HB / 7 / Angus Ernst; PR / 8 / Tom Hazelton / / (substituted off) 27' / (substituted on) 51'; HK / 9 / Rhys Davies / / (substituted off) 36' / (substituted on) 65'; PR / 10 / Franklin Pele / / (substituted off) 27' / (substituted on) 51' / (substituted off) 66'; SR / 11 / Charbel Tasipale; SR / 12 / Reubenn Rennie; LK / 13 / Tyler Slade (c) / / (substituted off) 65'; Interchange: IC / 14 / Jack Martin / / (substituted on) 27' / (substituted off) 51'; IC / 15 / Ethan Natoli / / (substituted on) 55'; IC / 17 / Vincent Rennie / / (substituted on) 27' / (substituted off) 51' / (substituted on) 66'; IC / 18 / Isaac Longmuir / / (substituted on) 36' / (substituted off) 55'; Concussion Substitute: RE / 23 / Caleb Hamlin-Uele; Reserves: RE / 5 / Tyla Tamou; RE / 6 / Lachlan Miller; Coach: / / Greg Matterson
| 23 April | 7 | Blacktown Workers Sea Eagles | Henson Park, Sydney | Win | 34-16 | Addison Demetriou (62', 73') 2 Tom Hazelton (2') 1 Franklin Pele (21') 1 Matt Ikuvalu (59') 1 Kade Dykes (67') 1 | Mawene Hiroti 5/6 (3', 23', 64', 69', 75') | | |
Team Details: FB / 1 / Kade Dykes; WG / 2 / Jonaiah Lualua; CE / 3 / Mawene Hiroti; CE / 4 / Kayal Iro / (substituted off) 72'; WG / 5 / Matt Ikuvalu; FE / 6 / Lachlan Miller; HB / 7 / Rhys Davies / (substituted off) 24'; PR / 8 / Tom Hazelton / (substituted off) 32' / (substituted on) 50'; HK / 9 / Jayden Berrell; PR / 10 / Franklin Pele / (substituted off) 23' / (substituted on) 52' / (substituted off) 70'; SR / 11 / Jesse Colquhoun; SR / 12 / Reubenn Rennie / (substituted off) 46'; LK / 13 / Tyler Slade (c) / (substituted off) 52' / (substituted on) 67'; Interchange: IC / 14 / Jack Martin / (substituted on) 32' / (substituted off) 50' / (substituted on) 72'; IC / 15 / Addison Demetriou / (substituted on) 24'; IC / 17 / Vincent Rennie / (substituted on) 46' / (substituted off) 67'; IC / 21 / Caleb Hamlin-Uele / (substituted on) 23' / (substituted off) 46' / (substituted on) 70'; Concussion Substitute: IC / 18 / Tyla Tamou / (substituted on) 46'; Coach: / / Greg Matterson
| 30 April | 8 | Penrith Panthers | St Marys Leagues Stadium, Sydney (Note: Match was originally set to take place at BlueBet Stadium.) | Loss | 12-26 | Luke Metcalf (39') 1 Franklin Pele (75') 1 | Luke Metcalf 2/2 (40', 76') | | |
Team Details: FB / 1 / Kade Dykes; WG / 2 / Jonaiah Lualua; CE / 5 / Matt Ikuvalu; CE / 15 / Addison Demetriou / / (substituted off) 79'; WG / 18 / Tyla Tamou; FE / 6 / Lachlan Miller / (yellow card) 52' / (substituted off) 74'; HB / 7 / Luke Metcalf; PR / 11 / Jesse Colquhoun / / (substituted off) 30' / (substituted on) 52'; HK / 9 / Jayden Berrell; PR / 10 / Franklin Pele / / (substituted off) 21' / (substituted on) 58'; SR / 4 / Kayal Iro / / (substituted off) 69' / (substituted on) 74'; SR / 12 / Reubenn Rennie / / (substituted off) 72' / (substituted on) 79'; LK / 13 / Tyler Slade (c) / / (substituted off) 23' / (substituted on) 52'; Interchange: IC / 17 / Vincent Rennie / / (substituted on) 21' / (substituted off) 52'; IC / 19 / Dylan O'Connor / / (substituted on) 69'; IC / 21 / Caleb Hamlin-Uele / / (substituted on) 23' / (substituted off) 52'; IC / 22 / Liam Harris / / (substituted on) 30' / (substituted off) 58' / (substituted on) 72'; Concussion Substitute: RE / 26 / Ethan McPherson; Reserves: RE / 3 / Mawene Hiroti; RE / 8 / Tom Hazelton; Coach: / / Greg Matterson
| 8 May | 9 | North Sydney Bears | North Sydney Oval, Sydney | Win | 40-28 | Sam Stonestreet (5', 33', 78') 3 Jonaiah Lualua (1', 63') 2 Luke Metcalf (16') 1 Kayal Iro (68') 1 Jayden Berrell (71') 1 | Braydon Trindall 4/8 (17', 35', 70', 73') | | |
Team Details: FB / 1 / Kade Dykes; WG / 2 / Jonaiah Lualua; CE / 11 / Kayal Iro; CE / 18 / Tyla Tamou; WG / 5 / Sam Stonestreet; FE / 6 / Luke Metcalf; HB / 7 / Braydon Trindall (c); PR / 8 / Tom Hazelton / (substituted off) 23' / (substituted on) 54'; HK / 9 / Jayden Berrell; PR / 23 / Caleb Hamlin-Uele / (substituted off) 19' / (substituted on) 54'; SR / 10 / Jesse Colquhoun; SR / 12 / Reubenn Rennie; LK / 26 / Liam Harris / (substituted off) 23' / (substituted on) 62'; Interchange: IC / 13 / Tyler Slade / (substituted on) 19' / (substituted off) 62'; IC / 17 / Franklin Pele / (substituted on) 23' / (substituted off) 54'; IC / 21 / Vincent Rennie / (substituted on) 23' / (substituted off) 54'; IC / 22 / Dylan O'Connor (Note: Was named on the bench but did not enter the game.); Concussion Substitute: RE / 16 / Mason McCarthy; Reserves: RE / 3 / Connor Tracey; RE / 4 / Mawene Hiroti; RE / 5 / Matt Ikuvalu; RE / 15 / Addison Demetriou; Coach: / / Greg Matterson
| | 10 | Bye | | | | | | | |
| 21 May | 11 | Mount Pritchard Mounties | Henson Park, Sydney | Win | 26-12 | Kayal Iro (30', 51') 2 Reubenn Rennie (17') 1 Tyla Tamou (60') 1 Myles Taueli (78') 1 | Mawene Hiroti 3/5 (19', 62', 80') | | |
Team Details: FB / 3 / Mawene Hiroti; WG / 2 / Jonaiah Lualua; CE / 22 / Sam Stonestreet; CE / 4 / Kayal Iro; WG / 5 / Jensen Taumoepeau; FE / 1 / Tyla Tamou; HB / 7 / Rhys Davies (c); PR / 8 / Caleb Hamlin-Uele / / (substituted off) 23' / (substituted on) 66'; HK / 9 / Jayden Berrell / (yellow card) 70'; PR / 10 / Jesse Colquhoun / / (substituted off) 29' / (substituted on) 57'; SR / 15 / Jonah Ngaronoa / / (substituted off) 66'; SR / 12 / Reubenn Rennie / / (substituted off) 72'; LK / 18 / Liam Harris / / (substituted off) 23' / (substituted on) 65'; Interchange: IC / 11 / Myles Taueli / / (substituted on) 23'; IC / 13 / Tyler Slade / / (substituted on) 23' / (substituted off) 65'; IC / 19 / Dylan O'Connor / / (substituted on) 72'; IC / 21 / Vincent Rennie / / (substituted on) 29' / (substituted off) 57'; Concussion Substitute: RE / 24 / Johnathan Tufuga; Reserves: RE / 6 / Luke Metcalf; RE / 15 / Addison Demetriou; Coach: / / Greg Matterson
| 28 May | 12 | Western Suburbs Magpies | Lidcombe Oval, Sydney | Draw | 21-21 | Jayden Berrell (22', 27') 2 Caleb Hamlin-Uele (12') 1 | Mawene Hiroti 4/4 (14', 24', 29', 38' pen) | Rhys Davies 1/1 (71') | |
Team Details: FB / 1 / Lachlan Miller; WG / 2 / Jonaiah Lualua; CE / 3 / Mawene Hiroti; CE / 4 / Kayal Iro; WG / 5 / Jensen Taumoepeau; FE / 15 / Rhys Davies (c); HB / 7 / Kade Dykes; PR / 23 / Caleb Hamlin-Uele / (substituted off) 26' / (substituted on) 50' / (substituted off) 71'; HK / 9 / Jayden Berrell; PR / 10 / Jesse Colquhoun / (substituted off) 50' / (substituted on) 68'; SR / 11 / Myles Taueli; SR / 12 / Reubenn Rennie / (substituted off) 55'; LK / 18 / Liam Harris / (substituted off) 21' / (substituted on) 68'; Interchange: IC / 13 / Tyler Slade / (substituted on) 21' / (substituted off) 68'; IC / 17 / Franklin Pele / (substituted on) 26' / (substituted off) 50' / (substituted on) 71'; IC / 21 / Vincent Rennie / (substituted on) 50' / (substituted off) 68'; IC / 26 / Tyla Tamou / (substituted on) 55'; Concussion Substitute: RE / 19 / Jonah Ngaronoa; Reserves: RE / 6 / Luke Metcalf; RE / 8 / Tom Hazelton; Coach: / / Greg Matterson
| 5 June | 13 | Canberra Raiders | GIO Stadium, Canberra | Loss | 22-30 | Luke Metcalf (71', 79') 2 Tyla Tamou (31') 1 Caleb Hamlin-Uele (66') 1 | Mawene Hiroti 1/2 (79'); Lachlan Miller 1/1 (67'); Luke Metcalf 1/1 (71') | | |
Team Details: FB / 1 / Lachlan Miller; WG / 22 / Sam Stonestreet; CE / 3 / Mawene Hiroti; CE / 5 / Jensen Taumoepeau; WG / 26 / Tyla Tamou; FE / 6 / Kade Dykes; HB / 7 / Luke Metcalf; PR / 8 / Tom Hazelton / (substituted off) 27' / (substituted on) 64'; HK / 9 / Jayden Berrell (c) / (substituted off) 30' / (substituted on) 64'; PR / 17 / Franklin Pele / (substituted off) 19' / (substituted on) 67'; SR / 11 / Myles Lee-Taueli; SR / 12 / Reubenn Rennie; LK / 18 / Liam Harris / (substituted off) 22' / (substituted on) 71'; Interchange: IC / 10 / Caleb Hamlin-Uele / (substituted on) 19' / (substituted off) 67'; IC / 13 / Tyler Slade / (substituted on) 27' / (substituted off) 71'; IC / 14 / Jesse Colquhoun / (substituted on) 22' / (substituted off) 64'; IC / 15 / Rhys Davies / (substituted on) 30' / (substituted off) 64'; Concussion Substitute: RE / 21 / Vincent Rennie; Reserves: RE / 2 / Jonaiah Lualua; Coach: / / Greg Matterson
| 12 June | 14 | Newcastle Knights | McDonald Jones Stadium, Newcastle | Win | 38-12 | Kade Dykes (16', 20') 2 Luke Metcalf (53', 78') 2 Reubenn Rennie (30') 1 Jensen Taumoepeau (62') 1 Franklin Pele (71') 1 | Luke Metcalf 4/5 (55', 64', 73', 80'); Mawene Hiroti 1/2 (21') | | |
Team Details: FB / 1 / Lachlan Miller; WG / 2 / Tyla Tamou; CE / 3 / Mawene Hiroti; CE / 4 / Kayal Iro; WG / 5 / Jensen Taumoepeau; FE / 6 / Kade Dykes; HB / 7 / Luke Metcalf; PR / 8 / Franklin Pele / (substituted off) 26' / (substituted on) 64'; HK / 9 / Jayden Berrell (c) / (substituted off) 59' / (substituted on) 70'; PR / 17 / Caleb Hamlin-Uele / (substituted off) 25' / (substituted on) 66'; SR / 11 / Myles Lee-Taueli; SR / 12 / Reubenn Rennie / (substituted off) 40'; LK / 13 / Tyler Slade / (substituted off) 66'; Interchange: IC / 15 / Rhys Davies / (substituted on) 59'; IC / 18 / Liam Harris / (substituted on) 25' / (substituted off) 70'; IC / 19 / Jonah Ngaronoa / (substituted on) 40'; IC / 21 / Vincent Rennie / (substituted on) 26' / (substituted off) 64'; Concussion Substitute: RE / 22 / Addison Demetriou; Reserves: RE / 10 / Jesse Colquhoun; Coach: / / Greg Matterson
| 18 June | 15 | Penrith Panthers | Henson Park, Sydney | Loss | 6-26 | Kayal Iro (21') 1 | Luke Metcalf 1/1 (23') | | |
Team Details: FB / 1 / Lachlan Miller; WG / 2 / Jonaiah Lualua; CE / 3 / Mawene Hiroti; CE / 22 / Addison Demetriou; CE / 4 / Kayal Iro; WG / 5 / Jensen Taumoepeau; FE / 6 / Kade Dykes; HB / 7 / Luke Metcalf / (substituted off) 52'; PR / 8 / Franklin Pele / (substituted off) 20' / (substituted on) 64'; HK / 9 / Jayden Berrell (c); PR / 10 / Tom Hazelton / (substituted off) 23' / (substituted on) 64'; SR / 11 / Myles Lee-Taueli; SR / 14 / Jesse Colquhoun / (substituted off) 72'; LK / 16 / Billy Magoulias / (substituted off) 34'; Interchange: IC / 13 / Tyler Slade / (substituted on) 34' / (substituted off) 64'; IC / 15 / Rhys Davies / (substituted on) 52'; IC / 17 / Caleb Hamlin-Uele / (substituted on) 23' / (substituted off) 64'; IC / 20 / Kayne Kalache / (substituted on) 20' / (substituted off) 49' / (substituted on) 72'; Concussion Substitute: IC / 18 / Liam Harris / (substituted on) 49'; Reserves: RE / 3 / Mawene Hiroti; RE / 12 / Reubenn Rennie; RE / 21 / Vincent Rennie; RE / 26 / Tyla Tamou; Coach: / / Greg Matterson
| 2 July | 16 | Canterbury-Bankstown Bulldogs | CommBank Stadium, Sydney | Win | 28-16 | Kayal Iro (17') 1 Caleb Hamlin-Uele (26') 1 Braydon Trindall (45') 1 Tyla Tamou (49') 1 Mawene Hiroti (58') 1 | Braydon Trindall 4/6 (19', 27', 60', 65' pen) | | |
Team Details: FB / 1 / Lachlan Miller; WG / 2 / Matt Ikuvalu; CE / 5 / Mawene Hiroti; CE / 4 / Kayal Iro; WG / 26 / Tyla Tamou; FE / 15 / Kade Dykes; HB / 6 / Braydon Trindall (c); PR / 8 / Tom Hazelton / (substituted off) 25' / (substituted on) 62'; HK / 9 / Jayden Berrell / (substituted off) 62'; PR / 10 / Jesse Colquhoun / (substituted off) 27' / (substituted on) 42'; SR / 11 / Myles Lee-Taueli / (substituted off) 42' / (substituted on) 74'; SR / 12 / Kayne Kalache; LK / 13 / Billy Magoulias / (substituted off) 74'; Interchange: IC / 7 / Rhys Davies / (substituted on) 62'; IC / 14 / Tyler Slade / (substituted on) 27' / (substituted off) 39'; IC / 17 / Caleb Hamlin-Uele / (substituted on) 25' / (substituted off) 62'; IC / 18 / Liam Harris / (substituted on) 39'; Concussion Substitute: RE / 19 / Jensen Taumoepeau; Reserves: RE / 3 / Connor Tracey; RE / 21 / Vincent Rennie; RE / 22 / Reubenn Rennie; Coach: / / Greg Matterson
| 9 July | 17 | Mount Pritchard Mounties | Aubrey Keech Reserve, Sydney | Win | 46-14 | Franklin Pele (34', 37', 77') 3 Tyla Tamou (57', 72') 2 Tom Hazelton (3') 1 Lachlan Miller (14') 1 Kade Dykes (52') 1 | Mawene Hiroti 6/7 (5', 15', 36', 39', 58', 74'); Matt Ikuvalu 1/1 (54') | | |
Team Details: FB / 1 / Lachlan Miller; WG / 2 / Matt Ikuvalu / (substituted off) 58'; CE / 3 / Mawene Hiroti; CE / 4 / Kayal Iro; WG / 5 / Tyla Tamou; FE / 6 / Kade Dykes; HB / 15 / Rhys Davies; PR / 8 / Tom Hazelton / (substituted off) 25' / (substituted on) 63'; HK / 9 / Jayden Berrell (c) / (substituted off) 68'; PR / 10 / Jesse Colquhoun / (substituted off) 25' / (substituted on) 57'; SR / 11 / Myles Lee-Taueli / (substituted off) 73'; SR / 12 / Kayne Kalache; LK / 13 / Billy Magoulias / (substituted off) 33' / (substituted on) 44' / (substituted off) 61' / (substituted on) 68'; Interchange: IC / 17 / Caleb Hamlin-Uele / (substituted on) 25' / (substituted off) 57'; IC / 18 / Liam Harris / (substituted on) 33' / (substituted off) 63' / (substituted on) 73'; IC / 21 / Franklin Pele / (substituted on) 25' / (substituted off) 44' / (substituted on) 61'; IC / 22 / Jensen Taumoepeau / (substituted on) 58'; Concussion Substitute: RE / 23 / Vincent Rennie; Reserves: RE / 7 / Luke Metcalf; Coach: / / Greg Matterson
| 15 July | 18 | Parramatta Eels | Henson Park, Sydney (Note: Match was originally set to take place at CommBank Stadium.) | Win | 30-10 | Kayal Iro (29', 32') 2 Tom Hazelton (9') 1 Tyla Tamou (69') 1 Kade Dykes (78') 1 | Lachlan Miller 5/6 (11', 16' pen, 34', 71', 78') | | |
Team Details: FB / 6 / Kade Dykes; WG / 15 / Jonaiah Lualua; CE / 3 / Jensen Taumoepeau / (substituted off) 71'; CE / 4 / Kayal Iro; WG / 5 / Tyla Tamou; FE / 1 / Lachlan Miller; HB / 7 / Rhys Davies; PR / 8 / Tom Hazelton / (substituted off) 24' / (substituted on) 50'; HK / 9 / Jayden Berrell (c); PR / 17 / Caleb Hamlin-Uele / (substituted off) 24' / (substituted on) 52'; SR / 11 / Myles Lee-Taueli / (substituted off) 19'; SR / 12 / Kayne Kalache; LK / 13 / Billy Magoulias / (substituted off) 52' / (substituted on) 65'; Interchange: IC / 14 / Charbel Tasipale / (substituted on) 19'; IC / 18 / Liam Harris / (substituted on) 24' / (substituted off) 65'; IC / 21 / Vincent Rennie / (substituted on) 24' / (substituted off) 50'; IC / 26 / James Coyne / (substituted on) 71'; Concussion Substitute: RE / 19 / Jackson Ferris; Reserves: RE / 2 / Matt Ikuvalu; RE / 10 / Jesse Colquhoun; Coach: / / Greg Matterson
| 23 July | 19 | North Sydney Bears | Henson Park, Sydney | Win | 20-14 | Mawene Hiroti (41') 1 Franklin Pele (45') 1 Matt Ikuvalu (55') 1 Kade Dykes (71') 1 | Mawene Hiroti 2/4 (47', 73') | | |
Team Details: FB / 1 / Kade Dykes; WG / 2 / Matt Ikuvalu; CE / 3 / Mawene Hiroti; CE / 4 / Kayal Iro; WG / 5 / Tyla Tamou; FE / 6 / Lachlan Miller; HB / 7 / Rhys Davies; PR / 8 / Tom Hazelton / (substituted off) 25' / (substituted on) 64'; HK / 9 / Jayden Berrell (c); PR / 10 / Jesse Colquhoun / (substituted off) 25' / (substituted on) 55'; SR / 11 / Charbel Tasipale; SR / 12 / Kayne Kalache; LK / 23 / Vincent Rennie / (substituted off) 18'; Interchange: IC / 15 / Jensen Taumoepeau / (substituted on) 68'; IC / 17 / Caleb Hamlin-Uele / (substituted on) 18' / (substituted off) 55'; IC / 18 / Liam Harris / (substituted on) 25' / (substituted off) 68'; IC / 21 / Franklin Pele / (substituted on) 25' / (substituted off) 64'; Concussion Substitute: RE / 19 / Jonaiah Lualua; Reserves: RE / 13 / Billy Magoulias; Coach: / / Greg Matterson
| 30 July | 20 | South Sydney Rabbitohs | Henson Park, Sydney | Win | 42-18 | Luke Metcalf (19') 1 Caleb Hamlin-Uele (30') 1 Charbel Tasipale (37') 1 Matt Ikuvalu (49') 1 Mawene Hiroti (54') 1 Braydon Trindall (67') 1 Rhys Davies (74') 1 | Braydon Trindall 7/7 (21', 31', 38', 51', 55', 69', 75') | | |
Team Details: FB / 1 / Lachlan Miller / (substituted off) 68'; WG / 2 / Matt Ikuvalu; CE / 3 / Mawene Hiroti; CE / 4 / Kayal Iro; WG / 5 / Tyla Tamou; FE / 6 / Luke Metcalf; HB / 7 / Braydon Trindall (c); PR / 8 / Tom Hazelton / (substituted off) 24' / (substituted on) 61'; HK / 15 / Rhys Davies / (substituted off) 55' / (substituted on) 65'; PR / 10 / Jesse Colquhoun / (substituted off) 40'; SR / 11 / Charbel Tasipale; SR / 12 / Kayne Kalache; LK / 13 / Billy Magoulias / (substituted off) 27' / (substituted on) 55'; Interchange: IC / 17 / Caleb Hamlin-Uele / (substituted on) 24' / (substituted off) 65'; IC / 18 / Liam Harris / (substituted on) 40' / (substituted off) 73'; IC / 21 / Franklin Pele / (substituted on) 27' / (substituted off) 61' / (substituted on) 73'; IC / 22 / Jensen Taumoepeau / (substituted on) 68'; Concussion Substitute: RE / 23 / Vincent Rennie; Reserves: RE / 9 / Jayden Berrell; Coach: / / Greg Matterson
| 6 August | 21 | St. George Illawarra Dragons | Henson Park, Sydney | Win | 32-10 | Jayden Berrell (5') 1 Addison Demetriou (22') 1 Luke Metcalf (28') 1 Charbel Tasipale (59') 1 Franklin Pele (74') 1 Matt Ikuvalu (77') 1 | Mawene Hiroti 2/3 (7', 24'); Luke Metcalf 2/3 (62', 75') | | |
Team Details: FB / 4 / Kayal Iro; WG / 2 / Matt Ikuvalu; CE / 3 / Mawene Hiroti; CE / 22 / Addison Demetriou; WG / 19 / Jensen Taumoepeau; FE / 6 / Luke Metcalf; HB / 7 / Rhys Davies; PR / 8 / Tom Hazelton / / (substituted off) 23' / (substituted on) 64'; HK / 9 / Jayden Berrell (c) / (yellow card) 49'; PR / 10 / Jesse Colquhoun / / (substituted off) 23' / (substituted on) 64'; SR / 11 / Charbel Tasipale / (substituted off) 73'; SR / 12 / Kayne Kalache / / (substituted off) 64'; LK / 13 / Billy Magoulias / / (substituted off) 28' / (substituted on) 55'; Interchange: IC / 14 / Kurt Dillon / / (substituted on) 23' / (substituted off) 64'; IC / 15 / Reubenn Rennie / / (substituted on) 58'; IC / 17 / Caleb Hamlin-Uele / / (substituted on) 23' / (substituted off) 58'; IC / 21 / Franklin Pele / / (substituted on) 28' / (substituted off) 55' / (substituted on) 73'; Concussion Substitute: RE / 18 / Liam Harris; Reserves: RE / 1 / Lachlan Miller; RE / 5 / Tyla Tamou; RE / 23 / Vincent Rennie; Coach: / / Greg Matterson
| | 22 | Bye | | | | | | | |
| 20 August | 23 | Blacktown Workers Sea Eagles | 4 Pines Park, Sydney | Win | 50-8 | Franklin Pele (28', 62') 2 Mawene Hiroti (5') 1 Tom Hazelton (10') 1 Jesse Colquhoun (15') 1 Ryan Rivett (31') 1 Luke Metcalf (44') 1 Kayal Iro (50') 1 Charbel Tasipale (78') 1 | Mawene Hiroti 7/9 (11', 16', 30', 33', 52', 64', 79') | | |
Team Details: FB / 1 / Kayal Iro; WG / 2 / Mawene Hiroti; CE / 3 / Reubenn Rennie; CE / 4 / Addison Demetriou / (substituted off) 78'; WG / 5 / Jensen Taumoepeau; FE / 6 / Luke Metcalf / (substituted off) 69'; HB / 19 / Ryan Rivett; PR / 8 / Tom Hazelton / (substituted off) 23' / (substituted on) 62'; HK / 9 / Jayden Berrell (c) / (substituted off) 47' / (substituted on) 69'; PR / 10 / Jesse Colquhoun / (substituted off) 29' / (substituted on) 63'; SR / 11 / Charbel Tasipale; SR / 12 / Kayne Kalache; LK / 13 / Billy Magoulias / (substituted off) 27' / (substituted on) 63'; Interchange: IC / 7 / Rhys Davies / (substituted on) 47'; IC / 14 / Kurt Dillon / (substituted on) 23' / (substituted off) 62'; IC / 17 / Caleb Hamlin-Uele / (substituted on) 27' / (substituted off) 63'; IC / 21 / Franklin Pele / (substituted on) 29' / (substituted off) 63' / (substituted on) 78'; Concussion Substitute: RE / 26 / Tyla Tamou; Reserves: RE / 2 / Matt Ikuvalu; RE / 18 / Liam Harris; Coach: / / Greg Matterson
| 27 August | 24 | Canterbury-Bankstown Bulldogs | Henson Park, Sydney | Draw | 22-22 | Addison Demetriou (11') 1 Kayne Kalache (43') 1 Reubenn Rennie (48') 1 Tyla Tamou (63') 1 | Mawene Hiroti 3/5 (13', 45', 80' pen) | | |
Team Details: FB / 1 / Mawene Hiroti; WG / 2 / Tyla Tamou; CE / 3 / Reubenn Rennie; CE / 4 / Addison Demetriou / / (substituted off) 24'; WG / 5 / Jensen Taumoepeau; FE / 13 / Billy Magoulias; HB / 7 / Rhys Davies; PR / 8 / Tom Hazelton / / (substituted off) 24' / (substituted on) 57'; HK / 9 / Jayden Berrell (c) / (yellow card) 72'; PR / 14 / Kurt Dillon / / (substituted off) 24' / (substituted on) 57' / (substituted off) 75'; SR / 11 / Charbel Tasipale; SR / 12 / Kayne Kalache; LK / 10 / Jesse Colquhoun / / (substituted off) 40'; Interchange: IC / 17 / Caleb Hamlin-Uele / / (substituted on) 24' / (substituted off) 57' / (substituted on) 75'; IC / 18 / James Coyne / / (substituted on) 24'; IC / 21 / Franklin Pele / / (substituted on) 24' / (substituted off) 57' / (substituted on) 72'; IC / 26 / Liam Harris / / (substituted on) 40' / (substituted off) 72'; Concussion Substitute: RE / 23 / Vincent Rennie; Reserves: RE / 4 / Kayal Iro; RE / 6 / Luke Metcalf; Coach: / / Greg Matterson
Legend: Win Loss Draw Bye

==== Finals series ====
2022 Newtown Jets finals series game log: 0–0–2 (Home: 0–0–2; Away: 0–0–0)
| Date | Round | Opponent | Venue | Result | Score | Tries | Goals | Field Goals | Report |
|---|---|---|---|---|---|---|---|---|---|
| | Qualifying Final | Bye | | | | | | | |
| 10 September | Semi Final | Penrith Panthers | Netstrata Jubilee Stadium, Sydney | Loss | 18-28 | Kade Dykes (25') 1 Kayal Iro (34') 1 Vincent Rennie (54') 1 | Mawene Hiroti 3/3 (26', 36', 56') | | |
Team Details: FB / 1 / Kade Dykes; WG / 2 / Matt Ikuvalu / (substituted off) 13'; CE / 3 / Mawene Hiroti; CE / 4 / Kayal Iro; WG / 5 / Jensen Taumoepeau; FE / 6 / Billy Magoulias; HB / 7 / Luke Metcalf / (substituted off) 27'; PR / 8 / Tom Hazelton / (substituted off) 24' / (substituted on) 53'; HK / 9 / Rhys Davies; PR / 10 / Kurt Dillon (c) / (substituted off) 32' / (substituted on) 65'; SR / 11 / Charbel Tasipale / (substituted off) 74'; SR / 12 / Kayne Kalache; LK / 13 / Jesse Colquhoun / (substituted off) 53' / (substituted on) 74'; Interchange: IC / 15 / Reubenn Rennie / (substituted on) 24'; IC / 17 / Franklin Pele / (substituted on) 27' / (substituted off) 53' / (substituted on) 66'; IC / 18 / Liam Harris / (substituted on) 32' / (substituted off) 65'; IC / 26 / Tyla Tamou / (substituted on) 13'; Concussion Substitute: IC / 21 / Vincent Rennie / (substituted on) 53' / (substituted off) 66'; Coach: / / Greg Matterson
| 17 September | Preliminary Final | Canterbury-Bankstown Bulldogs | Netstrata Jubilee Stadium, Sydney | Loss | 26-28 | Reubenn Rennie (32', 43') 2 Kayal Iro (5') 1 Tom Rodwell (62') 1 Jayden Berrell (71') 1 | Braydon Trindall 3/6 (6', 45', 72') | Braydon Trindall 0/1 | |
Team Details: FB / 2 / Tyla Tamou; WG / 22 / Tom Rodwell; CE / 19 / Reubenn Rennie; CE / 4 / Kayal Iro; WG / 5 / Jensen Taumoepeau; FE / 15 / Rhys Davies; HB / 7 / Braydon Trindall; PR / 8 / Tom Hazelton / (substituted off) 26' / (substituted on) 54' / (substituted off) 70'; HK / 9 / Jayden Berrell (c); PR / 14 / Kurt Dillon / (substituted off) 28' / (substituted on) 53'; SR / 11 / Charbel Tasipale / (substituted off) 58'; SR / 12 / Kayne Kalache / (substituted off) 53'; LK / 13 / Billy Magoulias / (substituted off) 47' / (substituted on) 58'; Interchange: IC / 10 / Jesse Colquhoun / (substituted on) 26'; IC / 17 / Vincent Rennie / (substituted on) 70'; IC / 18 / Liam Harris / (substituted on) 47' / (substituted off) 68'; IC / 21 / Franklin Pele / (substituted on) 28' / (substituted off) 54' / (substituted on) 68'; Concussion Substitute: RE / 24 / Tyler Slade; Reserves: RE / 1 / Kade Dykes; RE / 3 / Mawene Hiroti; RE / 6 / Luke Metcalf; RE / 22 / Jonah Ngaronoa; Coach: / / Greg Matterson
Legend: Win Loss Draw Bye

=== Jersey Flegg Cup (U21s) ===
==== Regular season ====
2022 Sharks' Jersey Flegg regular season game log: 12–1–9 (Home: 7–0–4; Away: 5–1–5)
| Date | Round | Opponent | Venue | Result | Score | Tries | Goals | Field Goals | Report |
|---|---|---|---|---|---|---|---|---|---|
| 12 March | 1 | Canberra Raiders | Henson Park, Sydney | Win | 42-24 | Trentham Petersen (1', 20') 2 Kai Parker (13', 54') 2 Ryan Rivett (36') 1 Kade Dykes (51') 1 Jack Martin (67') 1 | Ryan Rivett 7/7 (2', 15', 21', 37', 52', 55', 69') | | |
Team Details: FB / 1 / Kade Dykes; WG / 2 / Tom Rodwell; CE / 3 / Noah Lester; CE / 4 / Jordan Samrani; WG / 16 / Trentham Petersen; FE / 6 / Manaia Waitere; HB / 7 / Ryan Rivett; PR / 8 / Jack Martin / (substituted off) 28' / (substituted on) 48'; HK / 17 / Tom DeMeio / (substituted off) 30'; PR / 14 / Rhys Dakin / (substituted off) 18' / (substituted on) 48' / (substituted off) 62'; SR / 11 / Kai Parker (c); SR / 12 / Kyle Pickering / (substituted off) 54'; LK / 13 / Blake Hosking; Interchange: IC / 9 / Sam Healey / (substituted on) 30'; IC / 10 / Josh Finau / (substituted on) 18' / (substituted off) 48' / (substituted on) 62'; IC / 15 / Alec Brennan / (substituted on) 28' / (substituted off) 48'; IC / 23 / Tom Crossle / (substituted on) 54'; Concussion Substitute: RE / 18 / Ryan Dodson; Reserves: RE / 5 / Sam Stonestreet; RE / 19 / Cody Fuz; RE / 20 / Kane Ball; RE / 21 / Tully Wilton; Coach: / / George Ndaira
| 19 March (Note: Originally scheduled for 20 March.) | 2 | Parramatta Eels | PointsBet Stadium, Sydney | Loss | 12-22 | Ryan Rivett (5') 1 Blake Hosking (53') 1 | Ryan Rivett 2/2 (6', 55') | | |
Team Details: FB / 1 / Kade Dykes; WG / 2 / Tom Rodwell; CE / 3 / Trentham Petersen; CE / 4 / Noah Lester; WG / 5 / Sam Stonestreet; FE / 6 / Manaia Waitere; HB / 7 / Ryan Rivett; PR / 8 / Jack Martin / (substituted off) 26' / (substituted on) 50'; HK / 17 / Tom DeMeio / (substituted off) 26'; PR / 14 / Rhys Dakin / (substituted off) 16' / (substituted on) 51' / (substituted off) 66'; SR / 12 / Kyle Pickering (c) / (substituted off) 50'; SR / 22 / Toby Boothroyd; LK / 13 / Blake Hosking; Interchange: IC / 9 / Sam Healey / (substituted on) 26'; IC / 10 / Josh Finau / (substituted on) 16' / (substituted off) 51' / (substituted on) 66'; IC / 15 / Alec Brennan / (substituted on) 26' / (substituted off) 50'; IC / 16 / Tom Crossle / (substituted on) 50'; Concussion Substitute: RE / 18 / Ryan Dodson; Reserves: RE / 11 / Kai Parker; RE / 19 / Cody Fuz; RE / 20 / Kane Ball; RE / 21 / Tully Wilton; Coach: / / George Ndaira
| 26 March | 3 | St. George Illawarra Dragons | Kirkham Oval, Camden | Draw | 22-22 | Kade Dykes (19', 37') 2 Sam Stonestreet (28', 47') 2 | Ryan Rivett 3/4 (20', 39', 48') | | |
Team Details: FB / 1 / Kade Dykes; WG / 2 / Tom Rodwell; CE / 22 / Jordan Samrani; CE / 4 / Noah Lester; WG / 5 / Sam Stonestreet; FE / 6 / Manaia Waitere; HB / 7 / Ryan Rivett; PR / 8 / Jack Martin / (substituted off) 26' / (substituted on) 46'; HK / 9 / Sam Healey / (substituted off) 51'; PR / 14 / Rhys Dakin / (substituted off) 18' / (substituted on) 30' / (substituted off) 46' / (substituted on) 61' / (substituted off) 67'; SR / 11 / Kai Parker (c) / (substituted off) 42'; SR / 12 / Toby Boothroyd; LK / 13 / Blake Hosking; Interchange: IC / 10 / Josh Finau / (substituted on) 18' / (substituted off) 61' / (substituted on) 67'; IC / 15 / Alec Brennan / (substituted on) 26' / (substituted off) 30'; IC / 16 / Tom Crossle / (substituted on) 42'; IC / 17 / Tom DeMeio / (substituted on) 51'; Concussion Substitute: RE / 3 / Trentham Petersen; Reserves: RE / 18 / Ryan Dodson; RE / 19 / Cody Fuz; RE / 20 / Kane Ball; RE / 21 / Tully Wilton; RE / 23 / Zane Jegers; Coach: / / George Ndaira
| 1 April | 4 | Newcastle Knights | PointsBet Stadium, Sydney | Win | 34-12 | Kade Dykes (13', 18') 2 Toby Boothroyd (2') 1 Tom Rodwell (43') 1 Ryan Rivett (53') 1 Noah Lester (58') 1 | Ryan Rivett 5/6 (3', 19', 44', 55', 60') | | |
Team Details: FB / 1 / Kade Dykes; WG / 2 / Tom Rodwell; CE / 16 / Trentham Petersen; CE / 4 / Noah Lester; WG / 5 / Sam Stonestreet; FE / 6 / Manaia Waitere; HB / 7 / Ryan Rivett; PR / 8 / Jack Martin / (substituted off) 28' / (substituted on) 48'; HK / 9 / Sam Healey / (substituted off) 55'; PR / 10 / Rhys Dakin / (substituted off) 23' / (substituted on) 48'; SR / 11 / Josh Finau / (substituted off) 48' / (substituted on) 63'; SR / 12 / Toby Boothroyd / (substituted off) 55'; LK / 13 / Blake Hosking (c) / (substituted off) 63'; Interchange: IC / 14 / Zane Jegers / (substituted on) 28' / (substituted off) 48'; IC / 15 / Tom Crossle / (substituted on) 23' / (substituted off) 48'; IC / 17 / Tully Wilton / (substituted on) 55'; IC / 18 / Ryan Dodson / (substituted on) 55'; Concussion Substitute: RE / 21 / Tom DeMeio; Reserves: RE / 3 / Jordan Samrani; RE / 19 / Cody Fuz; RE / 20 / Douglas Levi; RE / 22 / Toataua Porima; Coach: / / George Ndaira
| 10 April | 5 | Wests Tigers | PointsBet Stadium, Sydney | Win | 38-4 | Tom Rodwell (43', 66') 2 Sam Stonestreet (32') 1 Manaia Waitere (37') 1 Trentham Petersen (40') 1 Tom Crossle (52') 1 Tully Wilton (57') 1 | Ryan Rivett 5/7 (34', 41', 54', 58', 68') | | |
Team Details: FB / 1 / Kane Ball; WG / 2 / Tom Rodwell; CE / 3 / Trentham Petersen; CE / 4 / Noah Lester; WG / 5 / Sam Stonestreet; FE / 6 / Manaia Waitere; HB / 7 / Ryan Rivett; PR / 8 / Jack Martin / / (substituted off) 26' / (substituted on) 43'; HK / 9 / Sam Healey / / (substituted off) 49'; PR / 10 / Rhys Dakin / / (substituted off) 18' / (substituted on) 47'; SR / 11 / Josh Finau / (substituted off) 43' / (substituted on) 55'; SR / 12 / Toby Boothroyd / / (substituted off) 55'; LK / 13 / Blake Hosking (c) / / (substituted off) 55'; Interchange: IC / 15 / Alec Brennan / / (substituted on) 26' / (substituted off) 47'; IC / 16 / Tom Crossle / / (substituted on) 18'; IC / 17 / Tully Wilton / / (substituted on) 49'; IC / 23 / Marco Talagi / / (substituted on) 55'; Concussion Substitute: RE / 18 / Ryan Dodson; Reserves: RE / 14 / Zane Jegers; RE / 19 / Cody Fuz; RE / 20 / Douglas Levi; RE / 21 / Tom DeMeio; Coach: / / George Ndaira
| 15 April | 6 | South Sydney Rabbitohs | Henson Park, Sydney (Note: Match was originally set to take place at Accor Stadium.) | Win | 34-22 | Manaia Waitere (7', 34') 2 Tom Rodwell (2') 1 Tom Crossle (26') 1 Kane Ball (41') 1 Ryan Rivett (54') 1 | Ryan Rivett 5/6 (8', 28', 35', 43', 56') | | |
Team Details: FB / 1 / Kane Ball; WG / 2 / Tom Rodwell; CE / 3 / Trentham Petersen; CE / 4 / Noah Lester; WG / 5 / Jye Patterson; FE / 6 / Manaia Waitere; HB / 7 / Ryan Rivett; PR / 8 / Alec Brennan / / (substituted off) 16' / (substituted on) 48' / (substituted off) 64'; HK / 9 / Sam Healey / / (substituted off) 47'; PR / 10 / Rhys Dakin / / (substituted off) 18' / (substituted on) 40' / (substituted off) 64'; SR / 11 / Josh Finau / / (substituted off) 25'; SR / 12 / Toby Boothroyd; LK / 13 / Blake Hosking (c); Interchange: IC / 14 / Zane Jegers / (yellow card) 69' / (substituted on) 18' / (substituted off) 48' / (substituted on) 64'; IC / 15 / Marco Talagi / / (substituted on) 25' / (substituted off) 40' / (substituted on) 64'; IC / 16 / Tom Crossle / / (substituted on) 16'; IC / 17 / Tully Wilton / / (substituted on) 47'; Concussion Substitute: RE / 18 / Ryan Dodson; Reserves: RE / 5 / Sam Stonestreet; RE / 19 / Cody Fuz; RE / 20 / Toataua Porima; RE / 21 / Tom DeMeio; RE / 22 / Douglas Levi; Coach: / / George Ndaira
| 21 April | 7 | Manly Sea Eagles | PointsBet Stadium, Sydney | Loss | 22-24 | Kane Ball (6') 1 Jordan Samrani (26') 1 Noah Lester (31') 1 Tom Rodwell (41') 1 | Ryan Rivett 3/4 (28', 32', 43') | | |
Team Details: FB / 1 / Kane Ball; WG / 3 / Trentham Petersen; CE / 23 / Jordan Samrani; CE / 4 / Noah Lester; WG / 22 / Jye Patterson; FE / 6 / Manaia Waitere; HB / 7 / Ryan Rivett; PR / 8 / Alec Brennan / (substituted off) 23' / (substituted on) 48' / (substituted on) 62'; HK / 9 / Sam Healey / (substituted off) 50'; PR / 10 / Rhys Dakin / (substituted off) 19' / (substituted on) 39' / (substituted off) 56'; SR / 2 / Tom Rodwell; SR / 12 / Toby Boothroyd; LK / 13 / Blake Hosking (c); Interchange: IC / 14 / Zane Jegers / (substituted on) 19' / (substituted off) 39'; IC / 15 / Toataua Porima / (substituted on) 23' / (substituted off) 48' / (substituted on) 62'; IC / 16 / Ryan Dodson / (substituted on) 56'; IC / 17 / Tully Wilton / (substituted on) 50'; Concussion Substitute: RE / 18 / Marco Talagi; Reserves: RE / 5 / Sam Stonestreet; RE / 11 / Josh Finau; RE / 19 / Cody Fuz; RE / 20 / Douglas Levi; RE / 21 / Tom DeMeio; Coach: / / George Ndaira
| 30 April | 8 | Penrith Panthers | St Marys Leagues Stadium, Sydney | Loss | 16-36 | Jordan Samrani (31', 53') 2 Trentham Petersen (69') 1 | Ryan Rivett 2/3 (33', 54') | | |
Team Details: FB / 1 / Kane Ball; WG / 2 / Trentham Petersen; CE / 3 / Jordan Samrani; CE / 4 / Noah Lester; WG / 5 / Sam Stonestreet; FE / 6 / Manaia Waitere; HB / 7 / Ryan Rivett; PR / 8 / Jack Martin / (substituted off) 25' / (substituted on) 46'; HK / 9 / Sam Healey / (substituted off) 45' / (substituted on) 69'; PR / 10 / Rhys Dakin / (substituted off) 16' / (substituted on) 25' / (substituted off) 46' / (substituted on) 63'; SR / 11 / Tom Rodwell / (substituted off) 45'; SR / 12 / Toby Boothroyd; LK / 13 / Blake Hosking (c) / (substituted off) 63'; Interchange: IC / 14 / Alec Brennan / (substituted on) 16' / (substituted off) 40'; IC / 15 / Toataua Porima / (substituted on) 40'; IC / 16 / Douglas Levi / (substituted on) 45'; IC / 17 / Tully Wilton / (substituted on) 45' / (substituted off) 69'; Concussion Substitute: RE / 22 / Marco Talagi; Reserves: RE / 18 / Ryan Dodson; RE / 19 / Cody Fuz; RE / 21 / Tom DeMeio; Coach: / / George Ndaira
| 8 May | 9 | Sydney Roosters | PointsBet Stadium, Sydney | Loss | 14-26 | Noah Lester (11') 1 Ryan Rivett (18') 1 Sam Healey (37') 1 | Ryan Rivett 1/3 (39') | | |
Team Details: FB / 20 / Kane Ball; WG / 2 / Trentham Petersen; CE / 3 / Jordan Samrani; CE / 4 / Noah Lester; WG / 22 / Jye Patterson / / (substituted off) 48'; FE / 6 / Manaia Waitere; HB / 7 / Ryan Rivett; PR / 8 / Jack Martin / / (substituted off) 25' / (substituted on) 48'; HK / 9 / Sam Healey; PR / 10 / Rhys Dakin / / (substituted off) 18' / (substituted on) 25' / (substituted off) 48' / (substituted on) 58'; SR / 11 / Tom Rodwell; SR / 12 / Toby Boothroyd / / (substituted off) 61'; LK / 13 / Blake Hosking (c) / (yellow card) 65'; Interchange: IC / 14 / Alec Brennan / / (substituted on) 18' / (substituted off) 30' / (substituted on) 42' / (substituted off) 58'; IC / 15 / Toataua Porima / / (substituted on) 30' / (substituted off) 42'; IC / 16 / Douglas Levi / / (substituted on) 48'; IC / 18 / Ryan Dodson / / (substituted on) 61'; Concussion Substitute: RE / 19 / Jackson Lenzo; Reserves: RE / 1 / Kade Dykes; RE / 5 / Sam Stonestreet; RE / 17 / Marco Talagi; RE / 19 / Cody Fuz; RE / 21 / Tom DeMeio; Coach: / / George Ndaira
| | 10 | Bye | | | | | | | |
| 22 May | 11 | Victoria Thunderbolts | Casey Fields, Melbourne | Win | 22-20 | Tom Rodwell (14') 1 Douglas Levi (25') 1 Noah Lester (31') 1 Jordan Samrani (63') 1 | Ryan Rivett 3/4 (16', 26', 33') | | |
Team Details: FB / 1 / Kane Ball; WG / 2 / Trentham Petersen; CE / 3 / Jordan Samrani; CE / 4 / Noah Lester; WG / 11 / Tom Rodwell; FE / 6 / Manaia Waitere / (yellow card) 59'; HB / 7 / Ryan Rivett (c); PR / 8 / Jack Martin / / (substituted off) 29' / (substituted on) 45'; HK / 9 / Sam Healey / / (substituted off) 50'; PR / 10 / Rhys Dakin / / (substituted off) 16' / (substituted on) 29' / (substituted off) 45' / (substituted on) 55'; SR / 16 / Douglas Levi; SR / 12 / Toby Boothroyd / / (substituted off) 55'; LK / 13 / Ryan Dodson / / (substituted off) 33' / (substituted on) 61'; Interchange: IC / 15 / Toataua Porima / / (substituted on) 16' / (substituted off) 43'; IC / 18 / Jed Hardy / / (substituted on) 43' / (substituted off) 61'; IC / 19 / Jackson Lenzo / / (substituted on) 33'; IC / 21 / Tom DeMeio / / (substituted on) 50'; Concussion Substitute: RE / 23 / Ethan Cocco; Reserves: RE / 5 / Sam Stonestreet; RE / 14 / Alec Brennan; RE / 17 / Marco Talagi; RE / 18 / Malakai Manoa; Coach: / / George Ndaira
| 28 May | 12 | Wests Tigers | Lidcombe Oval, Sydney | Loss | 0-40 | | | | |
Team Details: FB / 1 / Kane Ball; WG / 2 / Tom Rodwell; CE / 16 / Trentham Petersen; CE / 4 / Noah Lester; WG / 5 / Sam Stonestreet; FE / 6 / Manaia Waitere; HB / 7 / Ryan Rivett; PR / 8 / Jack Martin / (substituted off) 28' / (substituted on) 49'; HK / 9 / Sam Healey / (substituted off) 44'; PR / 10 / Rhys Dakin / (substituted off) 17' / (substituted on) 28' / (substituted off) 49'; SR / 11 / Douglas Levi / (substituted off) 44' / (substituted on) 54'; SR / 12 / Toby Boothroyd / (substituted off) 54' / (substituted on) 59'; LK / 13 / Blake Hosking (c); Interchange: IC / 15 / Toataua Porima / (substituted on) 17' / (substituted off) 42'; IC / 17 / Ryan Dodson / (substituted on) 42'; IC / 18 / Jackson Lenzo / (substituted on) 44' / (substituted off) 59'; IC / 19 / Tom DeMeio / (substituted on) 44'; Concussion Substitute: RE / 20 / Jed Hardy; Reserves: RE / 3 / Jordan Samrani; RE / 14 / Alec Brennan; Coach: / / George Ndaira
| 5 June | 13 | Canberra Raiders | GIO Stadium, Canberra | Win | 42-8 | Jordan Samrani (6' 35', 67') 3 Manaia Waitere (23', 44') 2 Sam Healey (14') 1 Ryan Rivett (26') 1 Toby Boothroyd (41') 1 | Ryan Rivett 5/8 (16', 28', 37', 43', 45') | | |
Team Details: FB / 1 / Kane Ball; WG / 2 / Tom Rodwell; CE / 3 / Jordan Samrani; CE / 4 / Noah Lester; WG / 16 / Trentham Petersen; FE / 6 / Manaia Waitere; HB / 7 / Ryan Rivett; PR / 8 / Jack Martin / (substituted off) 27' / (substituted on) 50'; HK / 9 / Sam Healey / (substituted off) 54'; PR / 10 / Rhys Dakin / / (substituted off) 18' / (substituted on) 27'; SR / 11 / Kai Parker (c) / / (substituted off) 25' / (substituted on) 44' / (substituted off) 50'; SR / 12 / Toby Boothroyd; LK / 13 / Blake Hosking; Interchange: IC / 14 / Alec Brennan / / (substituted on) 18' / (substituted off) 40' / (substituted on) 62'; IC / 15 / Toataua Porima / / (substituted on) 40' / (substituted off) 62'; IC / 17 / Douglas Levi / / (substituted on) 25' / (substituted off) 44'; IC / 19 / Tom DeMeio / / (substituted on) 54'; Concussion Substitute: RE / 23 / Jake Biggs; Reserves: RE / 5 / Sam Stonestreet; RE / 18 / Ryan Dodson; Coach: / / George Ndaira
| 11 June | 14 | Newcastle Knights | St Johns Oval, Newcastle | Win | 18-12 | Jordan Samrani (10', 28') 2 Tom Rodwell (34') 1 Sam Stonestreet (46') 1 | Ryan Rivett 1/4 (48') | | |
Team Details: FB / 1 / Kane Ball; WG / 2 / Tom Rodwell; CE / 3 / Jordan Samrani; CE / 4 / Noah Lester; WG / 5 / Sam Stonestreet; FE / 16 / Trentham Petersen; HB / 7 / Ryan Rivett / (substituted off) 54'; PR / 8 / Jack Martin / / (substituted off) 25' / (substituted on) 43'; HK / 9 / Sam Healey / / (substituted off) 51' / (substituted on) 54'; PR / 10 / Rhys Dakin / / (substituted off) 17' / (substituted on) 25' / (substituted off) 43'; SR / 11 / Jake Biggs / / (substituted off) 42'; SR / 12 / Toby Boothroyd; LK / 13 / Blake Hosking (c); Interchange: IC / 14 / Alec Brennan / / (substituted on) 17' / (substituted off) 32' / (substituted on) 44'; IC / 15 / Toataua Porima / / (substituted on) 32' / (substituted off) 44'; IC / 17 / Tom DeMeio / / (substituted on) 51'; IC / 20 / Kyle Pickering / / (substituted on) 42'; Concussion Substitute: RE / 21 / Tully Wilton; Reserves: RE / 6 / Manaia Waitere; RE / 18 / Jed Hardy; RE / 19 / Ryan Dodson; RE / 20 / Malakai Manoa; Coach: / / George Ndaira
| 18 June | 15 | Penrith Panthers | PointsBet Stadium, Sydney | Loss | 18-30 | Kai Parker (38') 1 Ryan Rivett (52') 1 Sam Healey (59') 1 | Ryan Rivett 3/3 (40', 54', 60') | | |
Team Details: FB / 1 / Kane Ball; WG / 2 / Tom Rodwell; CE / 3 / Jordan Samrani; CE / 4 / Noah Lester; WG / 5 / Sam Stonestreet; FE / 16 / Trentham Petersen; HB / 7 / Ryan Rivett; PR / 8 / Jack Martin / (substituted off) 20'; HK / 9 / Sam Healey; PR / 10 / Rhys Dakin / (substituted off) 21' / (substituted on) 49' / (substituted off) 64'; SR / 11 / Kai Parker (c) / (substituted off) 49' / (substituted on) 57'; SR / 12 / Toby Boothroyd / (substituted off) 49' / (substituted on) 64'; LK / 13 / Blake Hosking; Interchange: IC / 14 / Alec Brennan / (substituted on) 20' / (substituted off) 45' / (substituted on) 64'; IC / 15 / Toataua Porima / (substituted on) 45' / (substituted off) 64'; IC / 17 / Kyle Pickering / (substituted on) 21' / (substituted off) 57'; IC / 20 / Jake Biggs / (substituted on) 49'; Concussion Substitute: RE / 19 / Tom DeMeio; Reserves: RE / 6 / Manaia Waitere; RE / 18 / Ryan Dodson; Coach: / / George Ndaira
| 1 July | 16 | Canterbury-Bankstown Bulldogs | Belmore Sports Ground, Sydney | Win | 26-24 | Jordan Samrani (13') 1 Blake Hosking (33') 1 Sam Healey (51') 1 Kyle Pickering (56') 1 Trentham Petersen (60') 1 | Ryan Rivett 3/5 (15', 34', 53') | | |
Team Details: FB / 1 / Kane Ball; WG / 2 / Tom Rodwell; CE / 3 / Jordan Samrani / (substituted off) 59'; CE / 4 / Noah Lester; WG / 5 / Sam Stonestreet; FE / 6 / Manaia Waitere; HB / 7 / Ryan Rivett; PR / 8 / Toby Boothroyd / (substituted off) 25' / (substituted on) 56'; HK / 9 / Sam Healey; PR / 18 / Lachlan Crouch / (substituted off) 29' / (substituted on) 51'; SR / 11 / Kai Parker (c) / (substituted off) 46' / (substituted on) 58'; SR / 12 / Kyle Pickering / (substituted off) 58'; LK / 13 / Blake Hosking; Interchange: IC / 14 / Alec Brennan / (substituted on) 25' / (substituted off) 51'; IC / 15 / Toataua Porima / (substituted on) 29' / (substituted off) 56'; IC / 16 / Trentham Petersen / (substituted on) 59'; IC / 17 / Jake Biggs / (substituted on) 46'; Concussion Substitute: RE / 19 / Cody Fuz; Reserves: RE / 10 / Rhys Dakin; RE / 20 / Tully Wilton; Coach: / / George Ndaira
| 7 July | 17 | Victoria Thunderbolts | PointsBet Stadium, Sydney | Win | 50-16 | Kane Ball (9', 62') 2 Tom Rodwell (24', 65') 2 Toby Boothroyd (4') 1 Manaia Waitere (21') 1 Ryan Rivett (33') 1 Noah Lester (41') 1 Sam Stonestreet (57') 1 | Ryan Rivett 7/9 (6', 10', 22', 26', 43', 64', 67') | | |
Team Details: FB / 1 / Kane Ball; WG / 2 / Tom Rodwell; CE / 3 / Jordan Samrani / (substituted off) 8'; CE / 4 / Noah Lester; WG / 5 / Sam Stonestreet; FE / 6 / Manaia Waitere; HB / 7 / Ryan Rivett; PR / 8 / Toby Boothroyd / (substituted off) 24' / (substituted on) 47'; HK / 9 / Sam Healey; PR / 10 / Lachlan Crouch / (substituted off) 26' / (substituted on) 47'; SR / 11 / Kai Parker (c) / (substituted off) 68'; SR / 12 / Kyle Pickering / (substituted off) 61' / (substituted on) 68'; LK / 13 / Blake Hosking / (substituted off) 49'; Interchange: IC / 14 / Alec Brennan / (substituted on) 24' / (substituted off) 47'; IC / 15 / Josh Finau / (substituted on) 26' / (substituted off) 47' / (substituted on) 61'; IC / 16 / Trentham Petersen / (substituted on) 8'; IC / 17 / Jake Biggs / (substituted on) 49'; Concussion Substitute: RE / 18 / Toataua Porima; Reserves: RE / 19 / Cody Fuz; RE / 20 / Lachlan Crossle; Coach: / / George Ndaira
| 16 July | 18 | Parramatta Eels | Kellyville Park, Kellyville (Note: Match was originally set to take place at Ringrose Park.) | Loss | 6-40 | Kane Ball (53') 1 | Tully Wilton 1/1 (54') | | |
Team Details: FB / 1 / Kane Ball; WG / 2 / Tom Rodwell; CE / 16 / Trentham Petersen; CE / 4 / Noah Lester; WG / 5 / Sam Stonestreet; FE / 6 / Manaia Waitere; HB / 7 / Ryan Rivett / (substituted off) 23'; PR / 8 / Toby Boothroyd / (substituted off) 20' / (substituted on) 48' / (substituted off) 56'; HK / 9 / Sam Healey; PR / 10 / Rhys Dakin / (substituted off) 29' / (substituted on) 43'; SR / 11 / Kai Parker (c) / (substituted off) 56' / (substituted on) 67'; SR / 12 / Kyle Pickering; LK / 13 / Blake Hosking; Interchange: IC / 14 / Alec Brennan / (substituted on) 29' / (substituted off) 43'; IC / 15 / Josh Finau / (substituted on) 20' / (substituted off) 48' / (substituted on) 56' / (substituted off) 67'; IC / 17 / Jake Biggs / (substituted on) 56'; IC / 21 / Tully Wilton / (substituted on) 23'; Concussion Substitute: RE / 18 / Lachlan Crouch; Reserves: RE / 3 / Jordan Samrani; RE / 19 / Cody Fuz; RE / 20 / Tom Crossle; Coach: / / George Ndaira
| 23 July (Note: Originally scheduled for 24 July.) | 19 | Sydney Roosters | Ringrose Park, Sydney (Note: Match was originally set to take place at Waverley Oval.) | Loss | 6-26 | Kai Parker (66') 1 | Trentham Petersen 1/1 (67') | | |
Team Details: FB / 1 / Kane Ball / (substituted off) 61'; WG / 2 / Tom Rodwell; CE / 3 / Trentham Petersen; CE / 4 / Noah Lester; WG / 5 / Sam Stonestreet; FE / 6 / Manaia Waitere; HB / 19 / Cody Fuz / (substituted off) 27'; PR / 17 / Lachlan Crouch / (substituted off) 39' / (substituted on) 59'; HK / 9 / Sam Healey; PR / 10 / Rhys Dakin / (substituted off) 18' / (substituted on) 39' / (substituted off) 53'; SR / 11 / Kai Parker (c); SR / 15 / Josh Finau / (substituted off) 23' / (substituted on) 53'; LK / 13 / Blake Hosking; Interchange: IC / 12 / Kyle Pickering / (substituted on) 18'; IC / 14 / Alec Brennan / (substituted on) 23' / (substituted off) 44' / (substituted on) 61'; IC / 16 / Tully Wilton / (substituted on) 27'; IC / 22 / Toataua Porima / (substituted on) 44' / (substituted off) 59'; Concussion Substitute: RE / 20 / Ryan Dodson; Reserves: RE / 7 / Ryan Rivett; RE / 8 / Toby Boothroyd; RE / 18 / Jake Biggs; Coach: / / George Ndaira
| 30 July | 20 | South Sydney Rabbitohs | PointsBet Stadium, Sydney | Win | 40-16 | Tom Rodwell (12', 28', 37', 69') 4 Sam Stonestreet (32', 66') 2 Ryan Rivett (49') 1 | Ryan Rivett 6/8 (14', 33', 38', 51', 64' pen, 67') | | |
Team Details: FB / 6 / Manaia Waitere; WG / 2 / Tom Rodwell; CE / 3 / Trentham Petersen; CE / 4 / Noah Lester / / (substituted off) 65'; WG / 5 / Sam Stonestreet; FE / 19 / Cody Fuz; HB / 7 / Ryan Rivett; PR / 17 / Lachlan Crouch / / (substituted off) 26' / (substituted on) 54'; HK / 9 / Sam Healey / / (substituted off) 58'; PR / 20 / Jack Martin / / (substituted off) 23' / (substituted on) 54' / (substituted off) 64'; SR / 11 / Kai Parker (c); SR / 8 / Toby Boothroyd / (substituted off) 67'; LK / 12 / Kyle Pickering / / (substituted off) 49' / (substituted on) 65'; Interchange: IC / 10 / Rhys Dakin / / (substituted on) 23' / (substituted off) 54' / (substituted on) 67'; IC / 15 / Josh Finau / / (substituted on) 26' / (substituted off) 54' / (substituted on) 64'; IC / 16 / Tully Wilton / / (substituted on) 58'; IC / 18 / Toataua Porima / / (substituted on) 49'; Concussion Substitute: RE / 14 / Alec Brennan; Reserves: RE / 1 / Kane Ball; RE / 13 / Blake Hosking; Coach: / / George Ndaira
| 6 August | 21 | St. George Illawarra Dragons | PointsBet Stadium, Sydney | Win | 38-4 | Tom Rodwell (11', 66') 2 Sam Stonestreet (5') 1 Sam Healey (25') 1 Ryan Rivett (36') 1 Kai Parker (49') 1 Manaia Waitere (69') 1 | Ryan Rivett 5/7 (7', 13', 27', 37', 69') | | |
Team Details: FB / 1 / Manaia Waitere; WG / 2 / Tom Rodwell; CE / 13 / Kyle Pickering; CE / 4 / Kane Ball / (substituted off) 51'; WG / 5 / Sam Stonestreet; FE / 6 / Cody Fuz; HB / 7 / Ryan Rivett; PR / 14 / Rhys Dakin / (substituted off) 23' / (substituted on) 46' / (substituted off) 63'; HK / 9 / Sam Healey; PR / 10 / Lachlan Crouch / (substituted off) 31' / (substituted on) 60'; SR / 11 / Kai Parker (c) / (substituted off) 52'; SR / 12 / Toby Boothroyd; LK / 15 / Josh Finau / (substituted off) 31' / (substituted on) 51'; Interchange: IC / 8 / Jack Martin / (substituted on) 23'; IC / 16 / Tully Wilton / (substituted on) 52'; IC / 17 / Toataua Porima / (substituted on) 31' / (substituted off) 60'; IC / 23 / Salesi Ataata / (substituted on) 31' / (substituted off) 46' / (substituted on) 63'; Concussion Substitute: RE / 22 / Tom Crossle; Reserves: RE / 3 / Trentham Petersen; RE / 18 / Alec Brennan; Coach: / / George Ndaira
| | 22 | Bye | | | | | | | |
| 20 August | 23 | Manly Sea Eagles | 4 Pines Park, Sydney | Loss | 22-50 | Sam Stonestreet (14') 1 Tully Wilton (51') 1 Tom Rodwell (57') 1 Sam Healey (61') 1 | Trentham Petersen 3/4 (52', 57', 61') | | |
Team Details: FB / 1 / Kane Ball / (substituted off) 40'; WG / 2 / Tom Rodwell; CE / 3 / Trentham Petersen; CE / 4 / Noah Lester; WG / 5 / Sam Stonestreet; FE / 16 / Tully Wilton; HB / 19 / Cody Fuz; PR / 8 / Jack Martin / (substituted off) 22' / (substituted on) 49'; HK / 9 / Sam Healey; PR / 10 / Lachlan Crouch / (substituted off) 22' / (substituted on) 49'; SR / 11 / Kai Parker (c); SR / 12 / Toby Boothroyd; LK / 13 / Kyle Pickering / (substituted off) 43' / (substituted on) 61'; Interchange: IC / 14 / Rhys Dakin / (substituted on) 22' / (substituted off) 49'; IC / 15 / Josh Finau / (substituted on) 22' / (substituted off) 49' / (substituted on) 60' / (substituted off) 61'; IC / 17 / Toataua Porima / (substituted on) 43' / (substituted off) 60'; IC / 23 / Douglas Levi / (substituted on) 40'; Concussion Substitute: RE / 20 / Tom Crossle; Reserves: RE / 6 / Manaia Waitere; RE / 7 / Ryan Rivett; RE / 18 / Alec Brennan; Coach: / / George Ndaira
| 27 August | 24 | Canterbury-Bankstown Bulldogs | PointsBet Stadium, Sydney | Win | 35-22 | Sam Healey (21') 1 Sam Stonestreet (30') 1 Manaia Waitere (33') 1 Tom Rodwell (52') 1 Ryan Rivett (59') 1 Josh Finau (66') 1 | Ryan Rivett 5/6 (22', 34', 53', 61', 68') | Ryan Rivett 1/1 (63') | |
Team Details: FB / 1 / Kane Ball; WG / 2 / Tom Rodwell; CE / 3 / Trentham Petersen; CE / 4 / Noah Lester; WG / 5 / Sam Stonestreet; FE / 6 / Manaia Waitere; HB / 7 / Ryan Rivett; PR / 8 / Jack Martin / (substituted off) 26' / (substituted on) 49'; HK / 9 / Sam Healey; PR / 10 / Lachlan Crouch / (substituted off) 25' / (substituted on) 45'; SR / 11 / Kai Parker (c); SR / 12 / Toby Boothroyd; LK / 15 / Josh Finau / (substituted off) 20' / (substituted on) 57'; Interchange: IC / 13 / Kyle Pickering / (substituted on) 20' / (substituted off) 57'; IC / 14 / Rhys Dakin / (substituted on) 25' / (substituted off) 49'; IC / 16 / Douglas Levi; IC / 17 / Toataua Porima / (substituted on) 26' / (substituted off) 45'; Concussion Substitute: RE / 18 / Salesi Ataata; Coach: / / George Ndaira
Legend: Win Loss Draw Bye

=== Harvey Norman Women's Premiership ===
==== Regular season ====
2022 Sharks' Women's regular season game log: 5–0–3 (Home: 2–0–2; Away: 3–0–1)
| Date | Round | Opponent | Venue | Result | Score | Tries | Goals | Field Goals | Report |
|---|---|---|---|---|---|---|---|---|---|
| 23 April | 1 | Mount Pritchard Mounties | NSWRL Centre of Excellence, Sydney | Win | 10-4 | Ella Barker (5') 1 Talei Holmes (53') 1 | Maddie Studdon 1/2 (55') | | |
Team Details: FB / 1 / Sam Bremner; WG / 2 / Ella Barker; CE / 3 / Andie Robinson; CE / 4 / Brooke Anderson; WG / 5 / Brandi Davis-Welsh; FE / 6 / Corban Baxter (c); HB / 7 / Maddie Studdon; PR / 8 / Kennedy Cherrington / (substituted off) 24' / (substituted on) 40'; HK / 9 / Quincy Dodd; PR / 10 / Holli Wheeler / (substituted off) 40' / (substituted on) 48'; SR / 11 / Monalisa Soliola / (substituted off) 19' / (substituted on) 50'; SR / 12 / Talei Holmes; LK / 13 / Keeley Kopara / (substituted off) 13' / (substituted on) 66'; Interchange: IC / 14 / Zali Hopkins; IC / 15 / Alexandra Weir / (substituted on) 19' / (substituted off) 50'; IC / 16 / Rueben Cherrington / (substituted on) 13' / (substituted off) 66'; IC / 17 / Claudia Foster / (substituted on) 24' / (substituted off) 48'; Concussion Substitute: RE / 18 / Natasha Penitani; Reserves: RE / 3 / Leianne Tufuga; RE / 4 / Tiana Penitani; RE / 5 / Kiana Takairangi; Coach: / / Tony Herman
| 29 April | 2 | South Sydney Rabbitohs | Central Coast Stadium, Gosford | Win | 36-0 | Tiana Penitani (1', 54') 2 Kiana Takairangi (47', 68') 2 Maddie Studdon (4') 1 Andie Robinson (22') 1 Alexandra Weir (65') 1 | Maddie Studdon 4/7 (6', 24', 48', 67') | | |
Team Details: FB / 1 / Sam Bremner; WG / 2 / Ella Barker; CE / 3 / Tiana Penitani (c); CE / 4 / Kiana Takairangi; WG / 5 / Andie Robinson; FE / 6 / Zali Hopkins; HB / 7 / Maddie Studdon; PR / 8 / Kennedy Cherrington / (substituted off) 35' / (substituted on) 49'; HK / 9 / Quincy Dodd; PR / 10 / Holli Wheeler / (substituted off) 24' / (substituted on) 35' / (substituted off) 67'; SR / 11 / Monalisa Soliola; SR / 12 / Talei Holmes / (substituted off) 53'; LK / 13 / Keeley Kopara / (substituted off) 14' / (substituted on) 62'; Interchange: IC / 14 / Brooke Anderson / (substituted on) 14' / (substituted off) 49'; IC / 15 / Alexandra Weir / (substituted on) 53'; IC / 16 / Natasha Penitani / (substituted on) 39' / (substituted off) 62'; IC / 17 / Claudia Foster / (substituted on) 24' / (substituted off) 39' / (substituted on) 67'; Concussion Substitute: RE / 20 / Violeta Tupuola; Reserves: RE / 5 / Brandi Davis-Welsh; RE / 6 / Corban Baxter; RE / 17 / Rueben Cherrington; Coach: / / Tony Herman
| 9 May | 3 | St Marys Saints | NSWRL Centre of Excellence, Sydney | Loss | 10-12 | Teagan Berry (23') 1 Tiana Penitani (59') 1 | Rueben Cherrington 1/1 (25'); Monalisa Soliola 0/1 | | |
Team Details: FB / 1 / Sam Bremner; WG / 2 / Leianne Tufuga; CE / 3 / Tiana Penitani; CE / 4 / Kiana Takairangi; WG / 5 / Teagan Berry; FE / 6 / Corban Baxter (c); HB / 7 / Zali Hopkins; PR / 8 / Claudia Foster / (substituted off) 24' / (substituted on) 56'; HK / 9 / Rueben Cherrington / (substituted off) 43'; PR / 10 / Holli Wheeler / (substituted off) 56' / (substituted on) 62'; SR / 11 / Monalisa Soliola; SR / 12 / Kennedy Cherrington; LK / 13 / Keeley Kopara / (substituted off) 16' / (substituted on) 43'; Interchange: IC / 14 / Mackenzie Lear / (substituted on) 38' / (substituted off) 62'; IC / 15 / Natasha Penitani; IC / 16 / Brooke Anderson / (substituted on) 16'; IC / 20 / Violeta Tupuola / (substituted on) 24' / (substituted off) 38'; Concussion Substitute: RE / 18 / Alexandra Weir; Reserves: RE / 2 / Ella Barker; RE / 5 / Andie Robinson; RE / 7 / Maddie Studdon; RE / 9 / Quincy Dodd; RE / 12 / Talei Holmes; Coach: / / Tony Herman
| 21 May | 4 | Wentworthville Magpies | PointsBet Stadium, Sydney | Win | 26-0 | Zali Fay (48', 65') 2 Brooke Anderson (7') 1 Sam Bremner (13') 1 Leianne Tufuga (44') 1 | Maddie Studdon 3/5 (8', 14', 66') | | |
Team Details: FB / 1 / Sam Bremner / (substituted off) 33' / (substituted on) 41'; WG / 2 / Zali Fay; CE / 3 / Leianne Tufuga; CE / 4 / Kiana Takairangi / (substituted off) 58'; WG / 5 / Andie Robinson; FE / 6 / Corban Baxter (c); HB / 7 / Maddie Studdon; PR / 8 / Tegan Dymock / (substituted off) 13'; HK / 9 / Quincy Dodd; PR / 10 / Holli Wheeler / (substituted off) 66'; SR / 11 / Monalisa Soliola; SR / 12 / Talei Holmes / (substituted off) 41' / (substituted on) 58'; LK / 13 / Brooke Anderson; Interchange: IC / 14 / Zali Hopkins / (substituted on) 33'; IC / 15 / Natasha Penitani / (substituted on) 13' / (substituted off) 19'; IC / 16 / Tayla Curtis / (substituted on) 27'; IC / 17 / Anna-Seata Takapautolo / (substituted on) 19' / (substituted off) 27' / (substituted on) 66'; Concussion Substitute: RE / 18 / Alexandra Weir; Coach: / / Tony Herman
| 30 May | 5 | Wests Tigers | NSWRL Centre of Excellence, Sydney | Win | 20-16 | Talei Holmes (32', 46') 2 Andie Robinson (21') 1 Zali Fay (54') 1 | Maddie Studdon 2/4 (22', 34') | | |
Team Details: FB / 1 / Tiana Penitani (c); WG / 2 / Zali Fay; CE / 3 / Leianne Tufuga; CE / 4 / Andie Robinson; WG / 5 / Teagan Berry; FE / 6 / Zali Hopkins; HB / 7 / Maddie Studdon; PR / 8 / Tegan Dymock / (substituted off) 26' / (substituted on) 51'; HK / 9 / Quincy Dodd; PR / 10 / Holli Wheeler; SR / 11 / Monalisa Soliola; SR / 12 / Talei Holmes; LK / 13 / Brooke Anderson / (substituted off) 15'; Interchange: IC / 14 / Rueben Cherrington; IC / 16 / Samantha Economos / (substituted on) 15'; IC / 17 / Claudia Foster / (substituted on) 26' / (substituted off) 51'; IC / 19 / Keeley Kopara; Concussion Substitute: RE / 18 / Tayla Curtis; Reserves: RE / 1 / Sam Bremner; RE / 5 / Ella Barker; RE / 6 / Corban Baxter; RE / 18 / Alexandra Weir; Coach: / / Tony Herman
| | 6 | Bye | | | | | | | |
| 11 June | 7 | Newcastle Knights | St Johns Oval, Newcastle | Loss | 6-16 | Quincy Dodd (63') 1 | Maddie Studdon 1/1 (64') | | |
Team Details: FB / 1 / Tiana Penitani (c); WG / 2 / Ella Barker; CE / 3 / Andie Robinson; CE / 4 / Zali Fay; WG / 5 / Teagan Berry; FE / 6 / Zali Hopkins; HB / 7 / Maddie Studdon; PR / 8 / Tegan Dymock / (substituted off) 16'; HK / 9 / Quincy Dodd; PR / 10 / Samantha Economos / (substituted off) 45' / (substituted on) 55'; SR / 11 / Alexandra Weir / (substituted off) 57'; SR / 12 / Talei Holmes; LK / 13 / Holli Wheeler; Interchange: IC / 15 / Natasha Penitani / (substituted on) 45' / (substituted off) 57'; IC / 16 / Tayla Curtis / (substituted on) 57'; IC / 17 / Claudia Foster / (substituted on) 16' / (substituted off) 27' / (substituted on) 41' / (substituted off) 55'; IC / 19 / Keeley Kopara / (substituted on) 27' / (substituted off) 41' / (substituted on) 57'; Reserves: RE / 1 / Sam Bremner; RE / 4 / Leianne Tufuga; Coach: / / Tony Herman
| 18 June | 8 | North Sydney Bears | PointsBet Stadium, Sydney | Loss | 4-10 | Teagan Berry (21') 1 | Maddie Studdon 0/1 | | |
Team Details: FB / 1 / Teagan Berry; WG / 2 / Zali Fay; CE / 3 / Leianne Tufuga; CE / 4 / Cassie Staples; WG / 5 / Ella Barker / (substituted off) 61'; FE / 6 / Zali Hopkins; HB / 7 / Maddie Studdon (c); PR / 17 / Claudia Foster / (substituted off) 15' / (substituted on) 29' / (substituted off) 43'; HK / 9 / Brooke Anderson; PR / 10 / Samantha Economos / (substituted off) 29' / (substituted on) 43'; SR / 11 / Tayla Curtis; SR / 12 / Talei Holmes; LK / 13 / Holli Wheeler / (substituted off) 69'; Interchange: IC / 14 / Natasha Penitani / (substituted on) 15' / (substituted off) 21'; IC / 15 / Chloe Boston / (substituted on) 61'; IC / 16 / Kirsty Sant / (substituted on) 55'; IC / 19 / Keeley Kopara / (substituted on) 21' / (substituted off) 55' / (substituted on) 69'; Concussion Substitute: RE / 18 / Anna-Seata Takapautolo; Reserves: RE / 11 / Alexandra Weir; RE / 14 / Mackenzie Lear; RE / 19 / Sienna Stewart; RE / 21 / Ngaire Hadfield; Coach: / / Tony Herman
| 2 July | 9 | Sydney Roosters | PointsBet Stadium, Sydney | Win | 11-10 | Teagan Berry (24', 50') 2 | Maddie Studdon 1/2 (25') | Maddie Studdon 1/1 (68') | |
Team Details: FB / 1 / Sam Bremner; WG / 2 / Zali Fay; CE / 3 / Leianne Tufuga / (substituted off) 10'; CE / 4 / Andie Robinson / (substituted off) 49'; WG / 5 / Teagan Berry; FE / 6 / Zali Hopkins; HB / 7 / Maddie Studdon (c); PR / 8 / Tegan Dymock / (substituted off) 29' / (substituted on) 47'; HK / 9 / Quincy Dodd; PR / 10 / Holli Wheeler; SR / 11 / Samantha Economos; SR / 12 / Talei Holmes; LK / 13 / Brooke Anderson / (substituted off) 47' / (substituted on) 49'; Interchange: IC / 14 / Rueben Cherrington / (substituted on) 40'; IC / 15 / Tayla Curtis / (substituted on) 10'; IC / 17 / Claudia Foster / (substituted on) 29' / (substituted off) 40'; IC / 19 / Keeley Kopara; Concussion Substitute: RE / 18 / Ella Barker; Reserves: RE / 3 / Tiana Penitani; Coach: / / Tony Herman
Legend: Win Loss Draw Bye

==== Finals series ====
2022 Sharks' Women's finals series game log: 1–0–1 (Home: 0–0–1; Away: 1–0–0)
| Date | Round | Opponent | Venue | Result | Score | Tries | Goals | Field Goals | Report |
|---|---|---|---|---|---|---|---|---|---|
| 9 July | Semi Final | Mount Pritchard Mounties | Netstrata Jubilee Stadium, Sydney | Win | 22-4 | Sam Bremner (12') 1 Zali Fay (23') 1 Maddie Studdon (58') 1 Quincy Dodd (70') 1 | Maddie Studdon 3/5 (14', 60', 66' pen) | | |
Team Details: FB / 1 / Sam Bremner; WG / 2 / Zali Fay; CE / 3 / Tiana Penitani (c); CE / 4 / Leianne Tufuga / / (substituted off) 62'; WG / 5 / Teagan Berry; FE / 6 / Zali Hopkins; HB / 7 / Maddie Studdon (c); PR / 8 / Tegan Dymock / / (substituted off) 27' / (substituted on) 44'; HK / 9 / Quincy Dodd / (substituted off) 43' / (substituted on) 53'; PR / 10 / Holli Wheeler / / (substituted off) 53' / (substituted on) 58'; SR / 11 / Samantha Economos; SR / 12 / Talei Holmes; LK / 13 / Brooke Anderson / / (substituted off) 29' / (substituted on) 43' / (substituted off) 67'; Interchange: IC / 14 / Rueben Cherrington / / (substituted on) 29' / (substituted off) 58'; IC / 15 / Natasha Penitani / / (substituted on) 27' / (substituted off) 44'; IC / 16 / Kirsty Sant / / (substituted on) 67'; IC / 17 / Cassie Staples / / (substituted on) 62'; Concussion Substitute: RE / 18 / Ella Barker; Coach: / / Tony Herman
| 16 July | Grand Final | Wests Tigers | Campbelltown Sports Stadium, Sydney | Loss | 20-21 | Tiana Penitani (17') 1 Talei Holmes (43') 1 Zali Fay (54') 1 Sam Bremner (68') 1 | Maddie Studdon 2/5 (31' pen, 71') | | |
Team Details: FB / 1 / Sam Bremner; WG / 2 / Zali Fay; CE / 3 / Tiana Penitani (c); CE / 4 / Leianne Tufuga; WG / 5 / Teagan Berry; FE / 6 / Zali Hopkins; HB / 7 / Maddie Studdon; PR / 8 / Tegan Dymock / (substituted off) 22' / (substituted on) 47'; HK / 9 / Quincy Dodd; PR / 10 / Holli Wheeler / (substituted off) 47' / (substituted on) 54'; SR / 11 / Samantha Economos; SR / 12 / Talei Holmes; LK / 13 / Brooke Anderson / (substituted off) 36' / (substituted on) 58'; Interchange: IC / 14 / Rueben Cherrington / (substituted on) 22' / (substituted off) 58'; IC / 15 / Natasha Penitani / (substituted on) 36' / (substituted off) 54'; IC / 16 / Kirsty Sant; IC / 17 / Cassie Staples; Concussion Substitute: RE / 18 / Ella Barker; Coach: / / Tony Herman
Legend: Win Loss Draw Bye

== NSWRL Junior Reps ==
=== SG Ball Cup (U19s) ===
==== Regular season ====
2022 Sharks' SG Ball regular season game log: 4–1–3 (Home: 2–1–1; Away: 2–0–2)
| Date | Round | Opponent | Venue | Result | Score | Tries | Goals | Field Goals | Report |
|---|---|---|---|---|---|---|---|---|---|
| 5 February | 1 | Illawarra Steelers | PointsBet Stadium, Sydney | Loss | 16-28 | Te Wehi Waitere (22', 69') 2 Kobie Wilson (48') 1 | Jake Hay 1/2 (49'); Kobie Wilson 1/1 (70') | | |
Team Details: FB / 1 / Siteni Taukamo / (substituted off) 54'; WG / 2 / Te Wehi Waitere; CE / 3 / Ben Lavender; CE / 4 / Carl Bishop; WG / 5 / Koby Douglas; FE / 6 / Jake Hay; HB / 7 / Max Riolo (c); PR / 8 / Salesi Ataata / (substituted off) 20' / (substituted on) 30' / (substituted off) 43' / (substituted on) 58'; HK / 9 / Kobie Wilson; PR / 10 / Lachlan Crouch / (substituted off) 24' / (substituted on) 63'; SR / 11 / Sam Jinks / (substituted off) 63'; SR / 12 / JT Manuofetoa; LK / 13 / Ethan Cocco / (substituted off) 30' / (substituted on) 54'; Interchange: IC / 14 / Chaz Jarvis / (substituted on) 54'; IC / 15 / Sam McCulloch / (substituted on) 20' / (substituted off) 58'; IC / 16 / Lachlan Crossle / (substituted on) 24' / (substituted off) 54'; IC / 18 / Lawson Cotter / (substituted on) 43'; Concussion Substitute: RE / 17 / Zane Watson; Reserves: RE / 19 / Carlos Tarawhiti; RE / 20 / Kynan Hodges; Coach: / / Dave Howlett
| 12 February | 2 | Penrith Panthers | BlueBet Stadium, Sydney | Loss | 16-36 | Siteni Taukamo (31') 1 Sam McCulloch (42') 1 Ethan Cocco (67') 1 | Jake Hay 2/3 (43', 68') | | |
Team Details: FB / 1 / Siteni Taukamo; WG / 2 / Te Wehi Waitere; CE / 3 / Ben Lavender; CE / 4 / Carl Bishop; WG / 5 / Koby Douglas; FE / 6 / Jake Hay; HB / 7 / Max Riolo (c) / (substituted off) 28'; PR / 8 / Salesi Ataata / (substituted off) 19' / (substituted on) 27' / (substituted off) 49' / (substituted on) 61'; HK / 9 / Kobie Wilson; PR / 10 / Lachlan Crouch / (substituted off) 27' / (substituted on) 57'; SR / 12 / JT Manuofetoa; SR / 18 / Lawson Cotter / (substituted off) 61'; LK / 13 / Ethan Cocco / (substituted off) 23' / (substituted on) 56'; Interchange: IC / 11 / Sam Jinks / (substituted on) 49'; IC / 14 / Chaz Jarvis / (substituted on) 28'; IC / 15 / Sam McCulloch / (substituted on) 19' / (substituted off) 56'; IC / 16 / Lachlan Crossle / (substituted on) 23' / (substituted off) 57'; Concussion Substitute: RE / 17 / Zane Watson; Reserves: RE / 19 / Carlos Tarawhiti; RE / 20 / Kynan Hodges; Coach: / / Dave Howlett
| | 3 | Bye | | | | | | | |
| 27 February | 4 | Victoria Thunderbolts | Mars Stadium, Wendouree | Win | 30-22 | Ben Lavender (7') 1 Koby Douglas (18') 1 Chaz Jarvis (38') 1 Salesi Ataata (56') 1 Lachlan Crouch (60') 1 | Jake Hay 5/5 (8', 19', 39', 56', 62') | | |
Team Details: FB / 1 / Siteni Taukamo; WG / 2 / Te Wehi Waitere; CE / 3 / Ben Lavender; CE / 4 / Carl Bishop / (substituted off) 50'; WG / 5 / Koby Douglas; FE / 6 / Jake Hay; HB / 7 / Chaz Jarvis; PR / 8 / Salesi Ataata / (substituted off) 23' / (substituted on) 48'; HK / 9 / Kobie Wilson (c); PR / 10 / Lachlan Crouch / (substituted off) 30' / (substituted on) 52'; SR / 11 / Jed Hardy; SR / 12 / JT Manuofetoa; LK / 13 / Ethan Cocco / (substituted off) 25' / (substituted on) 52'; Interchange: IC / 15 / Sam McCulloch / (substituted on) 23' / (substituted off) 48'; IC / 16 / Lachlan Crossle / (substituted on) 25' / (substituted off) 52'; IC / 17 / Connor Te Kani / (substituted on) 50'; IC / 18 / Lawson Cotter / (substituted on) 30' / (substituted off) 52'; Concussion Substitute: RE / 20 / Kynan Hodges; Coach: / / Dave Howlett
| 5 March (Note: Match cancelled due to heavy rainfall.) | 5 | St. George Illawarra Dragons | PointsBet Stadium, Sydney | | | | | | |
| 20 March | 6 | Manly Sea Eagles | PointsBet Stadium, Sydney | Win | 24-22 | Lawson Cotter (4') 1 Chaz Jarvis (39') 1 Kristian Dixon (43') 1 Ben Lavender (66') 1 | Jake Hay 4/4 (6', 40', 44', 67') | | |
Team Details: FB / 1 / Siteni Taukamo; WG / 2 / Te Wehi Waitere; CE / 3 / Ben Lavender; CE / 4 / Carl Bishop; WG / 5 / Kristian Dixon; FE / 6 / Jake Hay; HB / 7 / Max Riolo (c) / (substituted off) 35'; PR / 8 / Salesi Ataata / (substituted off) 28' / (substituted on) 41' / (substituted off) 56' / (substituted on) 63'; HK / 9 / Kobie Wilson / (substituted off) 24'; PR / 10 / Lachlan Crouch / (substituted off) 41' / (substituted on) 56'; SR / 11 / Jed Hardy; SR / 17 / Lawson Cotter; LK / 13 / Ethan Cocco / (substituted off) 31' / (substituted on) 53'; Interchange: IC / 14 / Chaz Jarvis / (substituted on) 35'; IC / 15 / Sam McCulloch / (substituted on) 28' / (substituted off) 63'; IC / 16 / Lachlan Crossle / (substituted on) 31' / (substituted off) 53'; IC / 18 / Kynan Hodges / (substituted on) 24'; Concussion Substitute: RE / 20 / Samson Mairi; Reserves: RE / 12 / JT Manuofetoa; RE / 19 / Talanoa Penitani; Coach: / / Dave Howlett
| 26 March | 7 | Canberra Raiders | PointsBet Stadium, Sydney | Win | 40-6 | Chaz Jarvis (17', 28') 2 Siteni Taukamo (42', 45') 2 Ben Lavender (21') 1 Talanoa Penitani (62') 1 Kristian Dixon (65') 1 | Jake Hay 6/7 (18', 23', 30', 43', 46', 66') | | |
Team Details: FB / 1 / Siteni Taukamo / (substituted off) 56'; WG / 2 / Te Wehi Waitere; CE / 3 / Ben Lavender; CE / 4 / Carl Bishop; WG / 5 / Kristian Dixon; FE / 6 / Jake Hay; HB / 14 / Chaz Jarvis; PR / 15 / Sam McCulloch / (substituted off) 43'; HK / 18 / Taj Brailey; PR / 10 / Lachlan Crouch / (substituted off) 28' / (substituted on) 56'; SR / 11 / Jed Hardy (c); SR / 12 / Lawson Cotter; LK / 13 / Ethan Cocco / (substituted off) 26' / (substituted on) 59'; Interchange: IC / 16 / Lachlan Crossle / (substituted on) 26' / (substituted off) 56'; IC / 17 / Kynan Hodges / (substituted on) 28' / (substituted off) 59'; IC / 19 / Talanoa Penitani / (substituted on) 56'; IC / 20 / Samson Mairi / (substituted on) 43'; Concussion Substitute: RE / 22 / Sam Jinks; Reserves: RE / 7 / Max Riolo (c); RE / 8 / Salesi Ataata; RE / 9 / Kobie Wilson; RE / 21 / Connor Te Kani; Coach: / / Dave Howlett
| 2 April | 8 | Balmain Tigers | Leichhardt Oval, Sydney | Loss | 28-30 | Lawson Cotter (41', 44') 2 Chaz Jarvis (11') 1 Kristian Dixon (30') 1 Carl Bishop (33') 1 Ben Lavender (38') 1 | Jake Hay 2/6 (13', 34') | | |
Team Details: FB / 1 / Siteni Taukamo / / (substituted off) 67'; WG / 2 / Te Wehi Waitere; CE / 3 / Ben Lavender; CE / 4 / Carl Bishop; WG / 5 / Kristian Dixon; FE / 6 / Jake Hay; HB / 7 / Chaz Jarvis; PR / 21 / Salesi Ataata / / (substituted off) 22' / (substituted on) 45' / (substituted off) 54' / (substituted on) 63'; HK / 9 / Taj Brailey; PR / 10 / Lachlan Crouch / (substituted off) 45' / (substituted off) 54'; SR / 11 / Jed Hardy (c); SR / 12 / Lawson Cotter; LK / 13 / Ethan Cocco / / (substituted off) 22' / (substituted on) 52'; Interchange: IC / 8 / Sam McCulloch / / (substituted on) 22' / (substituted off) 54'; IC / 14 / Talanoa Penitani / / (substituted on) 67'; IC / 15 / Samson Mairi / / (substituted on) 54' / (substituted off) 63'; IC / 16 / Lachlan Crossle / / (substituted on) 22' / (substituted off) 52'; Concussion Substitute: RE / 20 / Connor Te Kani; Reserves: RE / 17 / Kynan Hodges; RE / 19 / Sam Jinks; Coach: / / Dave Howlett
| 9 April | 9 | Canterbury-Bankstown Bulldogs | Cronulla High School, Sydney (Note: Match was originally set to take place at Belmore Sports Ground.) | Win | 26-24 | Ben Lavender (20') 1 Kristian Dixon (32') 1 Lawson Cotter (55') 1 Carl Bishop (58') 1 Lachlan Crouch (63') 1 | Jake Hay 3/5 (56', 59', 64') | | |
Team Details: FB / 1 / Siteni Taukamo; WG / 2 / Te Wehi Waitere; CE / 3 / Ben Lavender / (substituted off) 63'; CE / 4 / Carl Bishop; WG / 5 / Kristian Dixon; FE / 6 / Jake Hay; HB / 7 / Chaz Jarvis; PR / 8 / Salesi Ataata / (substituted off) 22' / (substituted on) 47'; HK / 9 / Taj Brailey; PR / 10 / Lachlan Crouch / (substituted off) 47' / (substituted on) 58'; SR / 11 / Jed Hardy (c); SR / 12 / Lawson Cotter; LK / 13 / Ethan Cocco / (substituted off) 26' / (substituted on) 49'; Interchange: IC / 14 / Talanoa Penitani / (substituted on) 63'; IC / 15 / Sam McCulloch / (substituted on) 22' / (substituted off) 49'; IC / 16 / Lachlan Crossle / (substituted on) 26' / (substituted off) 35'; IC / 17 / Kynan Hodges / (substituted on) 35' / (substituted off) 58'; Concussion Substitute: RE / 19 / Connor Te Kani; Reserves: RE / 18 / JT Manuofetoa; RE / 21 / Samson Mairi; Coach: / / Dave Howlett
Legend: Win Loss Draw Bye

=== Harold Matthews Cup (U17s) ===
==== Regular season ====
2022 Sharks' Harold Matthews regular season game log: 5–1–2 (Home: 1–1–2; Away: 4–0–0)
| Date | Round | Opponent | Venue | Result | Score | Tries | Goals | Field Goals | Report |
|---|---|---|---|---|---|---|---|---|---|
| 5 February | 1 | Illawarra Steelers | PointsBet Stadium, Sydney | Win | 30-10 | Jasper Catton (1', 20', 45') 3 Will Stewart (34') 1 Lachlan Araullo (55') 1 Chevy Stewart (58') 1 | Chevy Stewart 3/6 (3', 47', 56') | | |
Team Details: FB / 1 / Chevy Stewart (c); WG / 2 / Nick Pantelis; CE / 3 / Albert Litisoni; CE / 4 / Jayze Tuigamala; WG / 5 / Will Stewart; FE / 6 / Ashton Simmonds; HB / 7 / Bryce Sait; PR / 8 / Lachlan Araullo / / (substituted off) 19' / (substituted on) 39'; HK / 9 / Blake Woodger / / (substituted off) 44'; PR / 10 / Harry Samuel / / (substituted off) 1'; SR / 11 / Josh Sidoti; SR / 12 / Jasper Catton; LK / 13 / Alex Challenor / / (substituted off) 57'; Interchange: IC / 14 / Lochi McMartin-Callett / / (substituted on) 44'; IC / 15 / Lama Afu / / (substituted on) 22' / (substituted off) 39' / (substituted on) 57'; IC / 16 / Chris Christodoulou / (yellow card) 25' / (substituted on) 19' / (substituted off) 49'; IC / 17 / Jai Davies / / (substituted on) 1' / (substituted off) 22' / (substituted on) 49'; Concussion Substitute: RE / 18 / Max McCarthy; Reserves: RE / 19 / Viliami Hikila; RE / 20 / Charnze Enoka; Coach: / / Brad Kelly
| 12 February | 2 | Penrith Panthers | BlueBet Stadium, Sydney | Win | 20-6 | Jayze Tuigamala (7') 1 Nick Pantelis (19') 1 Lochi McMartin-Catlett (39') 1 Chevy Stewart (57') 1 | Chevy Stewart 2/4 (40', 59') | | |
Team Details: FB / 1 / Chevy Stewart (c); WG / 2 / Nick Pantelis; CE / 3 / Albert Litisoni; CE / 4 / Jayze Tuigamala; WG / 14 / Kurt Montgomery; FE / 6 / Ashton Simmonds; HB / 7 / Bryce Sait; PR / 8 / Lachlan Araullo / (substituted off) 16' / (substituted on) 35' / (substituted off) 53'; HK / 9 / Lochi McMartin-Callett / (substituted off) 47'; PR / 10 / Jai Davies / (substituted off) 16' / (substituted on) 40'; SR / 11 / Josh Sidoti; SR / 12 / Jasper Catton; LK / 13 / Alex Challenor / (substituted off) 23' / (substituted on) 45'; Interchange: IC / 15 / Lama Afu / (substituted on) 23' / (substituted off) 35'; IC / 16 / Chris Christodoulou / (substituted on) 16' / (substituted off) 40'; IC / 17 / Max McCarthy / (substituted on) 16' / (substituted off) 45' / (substituted on) 53'; IC / 20 / Charnze Enoka / (substituted on) 47'; Concussion Substitute: RE / 5 / Will Stewart; Reserves: RE / 18 / Dylan Frazer; RE / 19 / Viliami Hikila; Coach: / / Brad Kelly
| | 3 | Bye | | | | | | | |
| 12 March (Note: Due to heavy rainfall, round four was postponed. The Sharks were originally set to play on 27 February.) | 4 | Central Coast Roosters | Morry Breen Oval, Central Coast | Win | 34-0 | Jasper Catton (2', 46') 2 Nick Pantelis (8', 32') 2 Ashton Simmonds (14') 1 Will Stewart (22') 1 Jayze Tuigamala (56') 1 | Chevy Stewart 2/5 (3', 47'); Ashton Simmonds 1/1 (16'); Bryce Sait 0/1 | | |
Team Details: FB / 1 / Chevy Stewart (c); WG / 2 / Nick Pantelis; CE / 3 / Albert Litisoni; CE / 4 / Jayze Tuigamala; WG / 5 / Will Stewart / (substituted off) 50'; FE / 6 / Ashton Simmonds; HB / 7 / Bryce Sait; PR / 8 / Lachlan Araullo / (substituted off) 14' / (substituted on) 36'; HK / 9 / Blake Woodger / (substituted off) 28'; PR / 10 / Jai Davies / (substituted off) 14' / (substituted on) 42'; SR / 11 / Josh Sidoti; SR / 12 / Jasper Catton / (substituted off) 47'; LK / 13 / Alex Challenor / (substituted off) 42' / (substituted on) 50'; Interchange: IC / 14 / Lochi McMartin-Callett / (substituted on) 28'; IC / 15 / Lama Afu / (substituted on) 47'; IC / 16 / Chris Christodoulou / (substituted on) 14' / (substituted off) 36'; IC / 17 / Max McCarthy / (substituted on) 14'; Concussion Substitute: RE / 18 / Kurt Montgomery; Reserves: RE / 19 / Viliami Hikila; RE / 20 / Charnze Enoka; Coach: / / Glenn Brailey (Note: Deputised for Brad Kelly due to Covid protocols.)
| 5 March | 5 | St. George Illawarra Dragons | PointsBet Stadium, Sydney | | | | | | |
| 20 March | 6 | Manly Sea Eagles | PointsBet Stadium, Sydney | Loss | 10-18 | Ashton Simmonds (43') 1 Chevy Stewart (55') 1 | Chevy Stewart 1/2 (44') | | |
Team Details: FB / 1 / Chevy Stewart (c); WG / 2 / Nick Pantelis; CE / 3 / Albert Litisoni; CE / 4 / Jayze Tuigamala; WG / 18 / Kurt Montgomery; FE / 6 / Ashton Simmonds; HB / 7 / Bryce Sait; PR / 8 / Lachlan Araullo / (substituted off) 20' / (substituted on) 38'; HK / 9 / Blake Woodger / (substituted off) 51'; PR / 10 / Jai Davies / (substituted off) 18' / (substituted on) 43'; SR / 11 / Josh Sidoti; SR / 12 / Jasper Catton / (substituted off) 55'; LK / 13 / Alex Challenor / (substituted off) 43' / (substituted on) 55'; Interchange: IC / 14 / Lochi McMartin-Callett / (substituted on) 51'; IC / 15 / Lama Afu / (substituted on) 37' / (substituted on) 38'; IC / 16 / Chris Christodoulou / (substituted on) 20' / (substituted off) 37'; IC / 17 / Max McCarthy / (substituted on) 18'; Concussion Substitute: RE / 19 / Viliami Hikila; Reserves: RE / 5 / Will Stewart; RE / 20 / Charnze Enoka; RE / 21 / Lewis Budd; RE / 22 / Alex McFadden; RE / 23 / Tanna Featherstone; Coach: / / Brad Kelly
| 26 March | 7 | Canberra Raiders | PointsBet Stadium, Sydney | Loss | 18-10 | Tanna Featherstone (2') 1 Chevy Stewart (16') 1 | Chevy Stewart 1/2 (17') | | |
Team Details: FB / 1 / Chevy Stewart (c); WG / 2 / Nick Pantelis; CE / 3 / Albert Litisoni; CE / 4 / Richard Whalebone; WG / 5 / Tanna Featherstone; FE / 6 / Ashton Simmonds; HB / 7 / Bryce Sait; PR / 8 / Lachlan Araullo / (substituted off) 23' / (substituted on) 35'; HK / 9 / Blake Woodger / (substituted off) 52'; PR / 10 / Jai Davies / (substituted off) 20' / (substituted on) 35'; SR / 11 / Josh Sidoti; SR / 12 / Jayze Tuigamala / (substituted off) 46'; LK / 13 / Max McCarthy; Interchange: IC / 14 / Lochi McMartin-Callett / (substituted on) 52'; IC / 15 / Viliami Hikila / (substituted on) 23' / (substituted off) 35'; IC / 16 / Chris Christodoulou / (substituted on) 20' / (substituted off) 35'; IC / 17 / Lewis Budd / (substituted on) 46'; Concussion Substitute: RE / 18 / Kurt Montgomery; Reserves: RE / 20 / Charnze Enoka; RE / 21 / Alex McFadden; Coach: / / Brad Kelly
| 2 April | 8 | Balmain Tigers | Leichhardt Oval, Sydney | Win | 26-10 | Lachlan Araullo (11', 45') 2 Max McCarthy (19') 1 Chevy Stewart (39') 1 Charnze Enoka (42') 1 | Chevy Stewart 3/5 (12', 20', 41'); Bryce Sait 0/1 | | |
Team Details: FB / 1 / Chevy Stewart (c); WG / 2 / Nick Pantelis / (substituted off) 7'; CE / 3 / Albert Litisoni; CE / 4 / Jayze Tuigamala; WG / 5 / Richard Whalebone; FE / 6 / Ashton Simmonds; HB / 7 / Bryce Sait; PR / 8 / Lachlan Araullo / (substituted off) 18' / (substituted on) 38'; HK / 9 / Blake Woodger / (substituted off) 47'; PR / 10 / Max McCarthy / (substituted off) 58'; SR / 11 / Josh Sidoti; SR / 12 / Jasper Catton / (substituted off) 58'; LK / 13 / Alex Challenor / (substituted off) 38' / (substituted on) 58'; Interchange: IC / 14 / Lochi McMartin-Callett / (substituted on) 47'; IC / 15 / Alex McFadden / (substituted on) 38'; IC / 16 / Chris Christodoulou / (substituted on) 18' / (substituted off) 38' / (substituted on) 58'; IC / 17 / Charnze Enoka / (substituted on) 7'; Concussion Substitute: RE / 18 / Kurt Montgomery; Reserves: RE / 15 / Viliami Hikila; RE / 20 / Tanna Featherstone; RE / 22 / Lewis Budd; Coach: / / Brad Kelly
| 9 April | 9 | Canterbury-Bankstown Bulldogs | Belmore Sports Ground, Sydney | Win | 30-8 | Chevy Stewart (14', 35', 41') 3 Jai Davies (10') 1 Alex Challenor (26') 1 | Chevy Stewart 5/5 (11', 15', 27', 37', 43') | | |
Team Details: FB / 1 / Chevy Stewart (c); WG / 2 / Kurt Montgomery; CE / 3 / Albert Litisoni; CE / 4 / Jayze Tuigamala; WG / 5 / Richard Whalebone; FE / 6 / Ashton Simmonds / / (substituted off) 59'; HB / 7 / Bryce Sait; PR / 8 / Lachlan Araullo / / (substituted off) 20' / (substituted on) 52'; HK / 9 / Blake Woodger / / (substituted off) 25' / (substituted on) 59'; PR / 17 / Jai Davies / / (substituted off) 20' / (substituted on) 42'; SR / 11 / Josh Sidoti; SR / 10 / Max McCarthy / / (substituted off) 52'; LK / 13 / Alex Challenor / (substituted off) 42'; Interchange: IC / 14 / Lochi McMartin-Callett / / (substituted on) 25'; IC / 15 / Alex McFadden / / (substituted on) 20' / (substituted off) 52'; IC / 16 / Chris Christodoulou / / (substituted on) 38'; IC / 21 / Lama Afu / / (substituted on) 20' / (substituted off) 38' / (substituted on) 52'; Concussion Substitute: RE / 20 / Charnze Enoka; Reserves: RE / 12 / Jasper Catton; RE / 18 / Tanna Featherstone; RE / 19 / Viliami Hikila; Coach: / / Brad Kelly
Legend: Win Loss Draw Bye

==== Finals series ====
2022 Sharks' Harold Matthews finals series game log: 2–0–1 (Home: 1–0–0; Away: 1–0–1)
| Date | Round | Opponent | Venue | Result | Score | Tries | Goals | Field Goals | Report |
|---|---|---|---|---|---|---|---|---|---|
| 15 April | Semi Final | Parramatta Eels | St Marys Leagues Stadium, Sydney | Win | 28-4 | Jayze Tuigamala (0') 1 Alex Challenor (8') 1 Richard Whalebone (34') 1 Jasper Catton (47') 1 Lachlan Araullo (51') 1 | Chevy Stewart 4/5 (2', 9', 48', 53') | | |
Team Details: FB / 1 / Chevy Stewart (c); WG / 2 / Kurt Montgomery; CE / 3 / Albert Litisoni; CE / 4 / Jayze Tuigamala / (substituted off) 46'; WG / 5 / Richard Whalebone; FE / 6 / Ashton Simmonds; HB / 7 / Bryce Sait; PR / 8 / Lachlan Araullo / (substituted off) 15' / (substituted on) 39'; HK / 9 / Blake Woodger / (substituted off) 48'; PR / 10 / Max McCarthy / (substituted off) 21' / (substituted on) 39'; SR / 11 / Josh Sidoti; SR / 12 / Jasper Catton; LK / 13 / Alex Challenor / (substituted off) 54'; Interchange: IC / 14 / Lochi McMartin-Callett / (substituted on) 48'; IC / 15 / Alex McFadden / (substituted on) 46'; IC / 17 / Jai Davies / (substituted on) 15' / (substituted off) 54'; IC / 21 / Lama Afu / (substituted on) 21' / (substituted off) 39' / (substituted on) 54'; Concussion Substitute: RE / 20 / Charnze Enoka; Reserves: RE / 16 / Chris Christodoulou; RE / 18 / Tanna Featherstone; RE / 19 / Viliami Hikila; Coach: / / Brad Kelly
| 23 April | Preliminary Final | Central Coast Roosters | Netstrata Jubilee Oval, Sydney | Win | 14-12 | Josh Sidoti (2') 1 Chevy Stewart (24') 1 Jay McLaughlin (34') 1 | Chevy Stewart 1/3 (25') | | |
Team Details: FB / 1 / Chevy Stewart (c) / (yellow card) 49'; WG / 2 / Jay McLaughlin; CE / 3 / Albert Litisoni; CE / 4 / Richard Whalebone; WG / 5 / Tanna Featherstone; FE / 6 / Ashton Simmonds; HB / 7 / Bryce Sait; PR / 8 / Lachlan Araullo / / (substituted off) 15' / (substituted on) 38' / (substituted off) 50' / (substituted on) 54'; HK / 9 / Blake Woodger / / (substituted off) 50'; PR / 10 / Jai Davies / / (substituted off) 21' / (substituted on) 39'; SR / 11 / Josh Sidoti; SR / 12 / Max McCarthy; LK / 13 / Alex Challenor / / (substituted off) 39' / (substituted on) 50'; Interchange: IC / 14 / Lochi McMartin-Callett / / (substituted on) 50'; IC / 15 / Alex McFadden / (yellow card) 17' / (substituted on) 15' / (substituted off) 42'; IC / 16 / Chris Christodoulou / / (substituted on) 21' / (substituted off) 38'; IC / 17 / Lama Afu / / (substituted on) 42' / (substituted off) 54'; Concussion Substitute: RE / 20 / Charnze Enoka; Reserves: RE / 2 / Kurt Montgomery; RE / 4 / Jayze Tuigamala; RE / 12 / Jasper Catton; RE / 19 / Viliami Hikila; Coach: / / Brad Kelly
| 30 April | Grand Final | Western Suburbs Magpies | CommBank Stadium, Sydney | Loss | 16-42 | Ashton Simmonds (44', 57') 2 Kurt Montgomery (10') 1 | Chevy Stewart 1/1 (12'); Bryce Sait 1/1 (58'); Kurt Montgomery 0/1 | | |
Team Details: FB / 1 / Chevy Stewart (c) / (red card) 37'; WG / 2 / Kurt Montgomery; CE / 3 / Albert Litisoni; CE / 4 / Richard Whalebone; WG / 5 / Tanna Featherstone; FE / 6 / Ashton Simmonds; HB / 7 / Bryce Sait; PR / 8 / Lachlan Araullo / / (substituted off) 20' / (substituted on) 36' / (substituted off) 49' / (substituted on) 58'; HK / 9 / Blake Woodger / / (substituted on) 49'; PR / 10 / Jai Davies / / (substituted off) 26' / (substituted on) 49'; SR / 11 / Josh Sidoti; SR / 12 / Max McCarthy; LK / 13 / Alex Challenor / / (substituted off) 42' / (substituted on) 58'; Interchange: IC / 14 / Lochi McMartin-Callett / / (substituted on) 49'; IC / 15 / Charnze Enoka / / (substituted on) 42' / (substituted off) 58'; IC / 17 / Lama Afu / / (substituted on) 26' / (substituted off) 36'; IC / 20 / Jasper Catton / / (substituted on) 20' / (substituted off) 58'; Concussion Substitute: RE / 16 / Alex McFadden; Reserves: RE / 18 / Jayze Tuigamala; RE / 19 / Viliami Hikila; RE / 21 / Chris Christodoulou; RE / 22 / Nick Pantelis; Coach: / / Brad Kelly
Legend: Win Loss Draw Bye

=== Tarsha Gale Cup (U19s) ===
==== Regular season ====
2022 Sharks' Tarsha Gale regular season game log: 4–1–3 (Home: 2–1–1; Away: 2–0–2)
| Date | Round | Opponent | Venue | Result | Score | Tries | Goals | Field Goals | Report |
|---|---|---|---|---|---|---|---|---|---|
| 5 February | 1 | St. George Illawarra Dragons | PointsBet Stadium, Sydney | Loss | 10-26 | Taylor Charman (52') 1 Tayla Curtis (54') 1 | Brooke Elliott 1/2 (55') | | |
Team Details: FB / 1 / Chloe Boston; WG / 2 / Ella Gould; CE / 3 / Taylor Charman; CE / 4 / Esther Kautoga / / (substituted off) 45'; WG / 5 / Zoe Topham; FE / 14 / Brooke Elliott / / (substituted off) 39' / (substituted on) 45'; HB / 7 / Sienna Stewart (c) / (yellow card) 19'; PR / 8 / Skye Brennan / / (substituted off) 17' / (substituted on) 34' / (substituted off) 52'; HK / 9 / Maddie Dodson / / (substituted off) 26' / (substituted on) 39'; PR / 10 / Kirsty Sant; SR / 11 / Tayah Beckett; SR / 12 / Tayla Curtis; LK / 13 / Sophia Griffin (c); Interchange: IC / 6 / Angie Tucker / / (substituted on) 39'; IC / 15 / Talei Vakauta / / (substituted on) 17' / (substituted off) 26'; IC / 16 / Cali Clark / / (substituted on) 26' / (substituted off) 34' / (substituted on) 52'; IC / 17 / Sereena Moussa / / (substituted on) 26' / (substituted off) 39'; Concussion Substitute: RE / 18 / Kalolaine Veikoso; Reserves: RE / 16 / Shontae Salmon; RE / 19 / Chelsee Austin; RE / 20 / Abbey Austin; Coach: / / Jonathan Te Wara
| 12 February | 2 | Illawarra Steelers | Collegians Sporting Complex, Wollongong | Loss | 4-22 | Tayla Curtis (42') 1 | Brooke Elliott 0/1 | | |
Team Details: FB / 1 / Chloe Boston; WG / 2 / Ella Gould; CE / 3 / Taylor Charman; CE / 4 / Chelsee Austin; WG / 5 / Tayah Beckett; FE / 6 / Brooke Elliott; HB / 7 / Sienna Stewart (c) / (substituted off) 19' / (substituted on) 30'; PR / 8 / Skye Brennan / (substituted off) 13' / (substituted on) 19' / (substituted off) 51'; HK / 9 / Maddie Dodson; PR / 10 / Kirsty Sant; SR / 11 / Emeline Taufaeteau / (substituted off) 18' / (substituted on) 47'; SR / 12 / Tayla Curtis; LK / 13 / Sophia Griffin (c) / (substituted off) 2'; Interchange: IC / 14 / Shontae Salmon / (substituted on) 2' / (substituted off) 43'; IC / 15 / Talei Vakauta / (substituted on) 13' / (substituted off) 26'; IC / 16 / Cali Clark / (substituted on) 26' / (substituted off) 30' / (substituted on) 51'; IC / 17 / Kalolaine Veikoso / (substituted on) 18' / (substituted off) 47'; Concussion Substitute: IC / 20 / Abbey Austin / (substituted on) 43'; Coach: / / Jonathan Te Wara
| 19 February | 3 | Canterbury-Bankstown Bulldogs | Belmore Sports Ground, Sydney | Loss | 4-22 | Esther Kautoga (21') 1 | Brooke Elliott 0/1 | | |
Team Details: FB / 1 / Chloe Boston; WG / 2 / Esther Kautoga / / (substituted off) 53'; CE / 3 / Taylor Charman; CE / 4 / Chelsee Austin; WG / 5 / Zoe Topham / (substituted off) 41'; FE / 6 / Brooke Elliott / / (substituted off) 33' / (substituted on) 41'; HB / 7 / Angie Tucker; PR / 8 / Skye Brennan / / (substituted off) 17' / (substituted on) 40'; HK / 9 / Sienna Stewart (c); PR / 10 / Shontae Salmon / / (substituted off) 26'; SR / 11 / Emeline Taufaeteau / / (substituted off) 26' / (substituted on) 46'; SR / 12 / Tayla Curtis; LK / 13 / Kirsty Sant; Interchange: IC / 14 / Tayah Beckett / / (substituted on) 26' / (substituted off) 40' / (substituted on) 53'; IC / 15 / Talei Vakauta / / (substituted on) 17'; IC / 17 / Kalolaine Veikoso / / (substituted on) 26' / (substituted off) 46'; IC / 18 / Sereena Moussa / / (substituted on) 33'; Concussion Substitute: RE / 19 / Laura Came; Reserves: RE / 2 / Ella Gould; RE / 9 / Maddie Dodson; RE / 13 / Sophia Griffin (c); RE / 16 / Cali Clark; RE / 20 / Abbey Austin; Coach: / / Jonathan Te Wara
| 26 February | 4 | North Sydney Bears | Cronulla High School, Sydney | Win | 16-0 | Esther Kautoga (34') 1 Chloe Boston (42') 1 Tayla Curtis (55') 1 | Brooke Elliott 2/3 (43', 57') | | |
Team Details: FB / 1 / Chloe Boston; WG / 2 / Ella Gould; CE / 3 / Taylor Charman; CE / 4 / Esther Kautoga; WG / 5 / Zoe Topham; FE / 6 / Angie Tucker / (substituted off) 55'; HB / 7 / Sienna Stewart (c); PR / 8 / Skye Brennan / (substituted off) 20' / (substituted on) 34' / (substituted off) 47'; HK / 9 / Maddie Dodson; PR / 10 / Kirsty Sant; SR / 11 / Tayah Beckett / (substituted off) 16'; SR / 12 / Tayla Curtis; LK / 13 / Brooke Elliott; Interchange: IC / 14 / Kalolaine Veikoso / (substituted on) 55'; IC / 15 / Cali Clark / (substituted on) 20' / (substituted off) 34'; IC / 16 / Laura Came / (substituted on) 47'; IC / 17 / Emeline Taufaeteau / (substituted on) 16'; Concussion Substitute: RE / 18 / Talei Vakauta; Reserves: RE / 4 / Chelsee Austin; RE / 10 / Shontae Salmon; RE / 18 / Sereena Moussa; Coach: / / Jonathan Te Wara
| 5 March | 5 | Penrith Panthers | PointsBet Stadium, Sydney | | | | | | |
| | 6 | Bye | | | | | | | |
| 26 March | 7 | Canberra Raiders | PointsBet Stadium, Sydney | Win | 16-6 | Skye Brennan (11') 1 Cali Clark (27') 1 Sienna Stewart (39') 1 | Brooke Elliott 2/3 (12', 40') | | |
Team Details: FB / 1 / Chloe Boston; WG / 2 / Ella Gould; CE / 3 / Taylor Charman; CE / 4 / Esther Kautoga; WG / 5 / Zoe Topham; FE / 6 / Angie Tucker; HB / 7 / Sienna Stewart (c) / (substituted off) 41'; PR / 8 / Skye Brennan / (substituted off) 16' / (substituted on) 35'; HK / 9 / Maddie Dodson / (substituted off) 30'; PR / 10 / Kirsty Sant; SR / 11 / Tayah Beckett; SR / 12 / Tayla Curtis; LK / 13 / Brooke Elliott / (substituted off) 19' / (substituted on) 30'; Interchange: IC / 14 / Talei Vakauta / (substituted on) 16' / (substituted off) 35'; IC / 15 / Cali Clark / (substituted on) 19' / (substituted off) 35' / (substituted on) 54'; IC / 16 / Emeline Taufaeteau / (substituted on) 41'; IC / 17 / Laura Came / (substituted on) 35' / (substituted on) 54'; Reserves: RE / 14 / Shontae Salmon; RE / 17 / Kalolaine Veikoso; RE / 19 / Sereena Moussa; Coach: / / Kylie O'Loughlin, Jack Gould and Fine Kula (Note: Deputised for Jonathan Te Wara due to Covid protocols.)
| 2 April | 8 | Indigenous Academy | Kirkham Oval, Camden (Note: Match was originally set to take place at Morry Breen Oval.) | Loss | 4-28 | Brooke Elliott (17') 1 | Brooke Elliott 0/1 | | |
Team Details: FB / 1 / Chloe Boston; WG / 2 / Esther Kautoga; CE / 3 / Taylor Charman; CE / 4 / Emeline Taufaeteau / (substituted off) 45'; WG / 5 / Zoe Topham; FE / 6 / Brooke Elliott; HB / 7 / Angie Tucker; PR / 14 / Talei Vakauta / (substituted off) 11' / (substituted on) 34' / (substituted off) 53'; HK / 9 / Rueben Cherrington (c); PR / 10 / Kirsty Sant; SR / 11 / Tayah Beckett; SR / 12 / Tayla Curtis; LK / 13 / Kalolaine Veikoso / (substituted off) 17' / (substituted on) 40'; Interchange: IC / 15 / Cali Clark / (substituted on) 11' / (substituted off) 22' / (substituted on) 53'; IC / 16 / Manaia Blair / (substituted on) 22' / (substituted off) 34'; IC / 18 / Susana Tupou / (substituted on) 45'; IC / 20 / Charlee Proctor / (substituted on) 17' / (substituted off) 40'; Concussion Substitute: RE / 10 / Shontae Salmon; Reserves: RE / 2 / Ella Gould; RE / 7 / Sienna Stewart; RE / 8 / Skye Brennan; RE / 9 / Maddie Dodson; RE / 19 / Laura Came; Coach: / / Jonathan Te Wara
| 9 April | 9 | Wests Tigers | Kirkham Oval, Camden (Note: Match was originally set to take place at Wests Tigers Centre of Excellence.) | Loss | 14-22 | Skye Brennan (12') 1 Emeline Taufaeteau (22') 1 Esther Kautoga (50') 1 | Brooke Elliott 1/3 (13') | | |
Team Details: FB / 1 / Chloe Boston; WG / 2 / Esther Kautoga; CE / 3 / Taylor Charman; CE / 4 / Emeline Taufaeteau; WG / 5 / Zoe Topham; FE / 6 / Brooke Elliott; HB / 7 / Angie Tucker; PR / 15 / Talei Vakauta / / (substituted off) 11'; HK / 9 / Sienna Stewart (c) / (yellow card) 16'; PR / 10 / Kirsty Sant / (yellow card) 45'; SR / 11 / Tayah Beckett; SR / 12 / Tayla Curtis; LK / 13 / Maddie Dodson / / (substituted off) 36' / (substituted on) 49'; Interchange: IC / 8 / Skye Brennan / / (substituted on) 11' / (substituted off) 21' / (substituted on) 40'; IC / 14 / Shontae Salmon / / (substituted on) 28' / (substituted off) 40'; IC / 16 / Cali Clark / / (substituted on) 21' / (substituted off) 28'; IC / 20 / Charlee Proctor / / (substituted on) 36' / (substituted off) 49'; Concussion Substitute: RE / 19 / Manaia Blair; Reserves: RE / 9 / Rueben Cherrington; RE / 13 / Kalolaine Veikoso; RE / 18 / Sereena Moussa; Coach: / / Jonathan Te Wara
Legend: Win Loss Draw Bye

== Awards ==
=== 2022 Dally M Awards ===
Held at Randwick Racecourse, Sydney on Wednesday, 28 September.

- Dally M Player of the Year: Nicho Hynes
- Provan-Summons Medallist: Nicho Hynes
- Dally M Halfback of the Year: Nicho Hynes

=== Sharks Awards Night ===
Held at Doltone House, Sylvania Waters, Sydney on Friday, 23 September.

- Porter Gallen Medal and Pontifex Player of the Year: Nicho Hynes
- Porter Gallen Nominees: Nicho Hynes, Briton Nikora, Blayke Brailey, Toby Rudolf & Cameron McInnes
- Tommy Bishop Players Player: Briton Nikora
- Steve Rogers Rookie of the Year: Lachlan Miller
- Members Player of the Year: Nicho Hynes
- Sharks Have Heart Community Award: Nicho Hynes
- Iron Man: Blayke Brailey
- Andrew Ettingshausen Club Person of the Year: Daniel Holdsworth
- Wellbeing and Education Excellence: Andrew Fifita (NRL) & Toby Boothroyd (Jersey Flegg)
- Jersey Flegg - Gavin Miller Player of the Year: Blake Hosking
- Jersey Flegg - Greg Pierce Players Player: Blake Hosking

=== Women's Awards Night ===
Held at Sharks at Kareela, Sydney on Friday, 29 July.

- Women’s Player of the Year: Holli Wheeler
- Harvey Norman Women’s Premiership Player of the Year: Holli Wheeler
- Harvey Norman Women’s Premiership Coaches Award: Brooke Anderson
- Tarsha Gale Player of the Year: Kirsty Sant
- Tarsha Gale Coaches Award: Chloe Boston

=== Junior Rep Awards Night ===
Held at Sharks at Kareela, Sydney on Thursday, 16 June.

- Greg Pierce Sharks Junior Representative Player of the Year: Chevy Stewart
- Harold Matthews Cup Player of the Year: Chevy Stewart
- Harold Matthews Cup Coaches Award: Max McCarthy
- SG Ball Player of the Year: Lachlan Crouch
- SG Ball Coaches Award: Chaz Jarvis

=== Rugby League Players’ Association Awards ===
- Dennis Tutty Award: Wade Graham
- 2022 Academic Team of the Year: Andrew Fifita

=== Other awards ===
- Ken Stephen Medal finalist: Nicho Hynes
- Ken Stephen Medal nominee & NRL Community Team of the Year: Nicho Hynes
