= Sahm =

Sahm may refer to:

- Sahm (surname), with a list of people of this name
- Sahm International, beer glassware manufacturer
- Saham (Arabic: صحم), a coastal town in northeastern Oman
- SAHM ('stay at home mom/mum/mother'); see homemaker
