= 2023–24 Pakistan federal budget =

Pakistani federal budget

2023-2024 Federal Budget
- State emblem of Pakistan
- Submitted: 9 June 2023
- Submitted by: Ishaq Dar
- Presented: 25 June 2023
- Passed: 25 June 2023
- Country: Pakistan
- Parliament: National Assembly of Pakistan
- Government: First Shehbaz Sharif ministry
- Party: Pakistan Muslim League (N)
- Finance minister: Ishaq Dar
- Treasurer: Ministry of Finance
- Total revenue: ▲ Rs. 12.378.164 trillion (US$44 billion)
- Total expenditures: ▲ Rs. 14.485 trillion (US$52 billion)
- Debt payment: ▲ Rs. 7.302.544 trillion (US$26 billion)
- Deficit: ▲6.53%
- GDP: Rs. 105.817 trillion (US$380 billion)
- Website: Budget Brief

The 2023–24 Pakistan federal budget was the Federal Budget implemented by the government of Pakistan for the fiscal year 2023–24. The revised budget was presented to Parliament on 25 June 2023 after Finance Minister Ishaq Dar introduced new taxation measures and expenditure cuts. The budget was accepted the next day. The Federal Budget entailed the raising of the Petroleum Development Levy (PDL) and lifting of all restrictions on imports. These revisions came after talks between the Prime Minister Shehbaz Sharif and IMF Director Kristalina Georgieva.

The total budget outlay (expenditure) of the new budget was Rs 14.46 trillion, 51% higher than the previous year. Federal Revenue for the budget was budgeted as Rs 12.163 trillion, with Rs 5.276 trillion being transferred to the provinces, leading to a net revenue of Rs 6.887 trillion, 36.9% higher than the previous year. The FBR's budgetary target was set at Rs 9.200 trillion, 23% than last year's target. The fiscal deficit being estimated at Rs 6.923 trillion or 6.54% of the GDP. The Finance Minister said it added no new taxes, no increases in duties on import of essential items, exemptions of custom duties on certain agricultural goods, and increased government wages and minimum wage.

By the end of the financial year (30 June), Pakistan's real GDP growth rate was reduced to 0.3 percent, before rising to 2.69 percent in the first quarter of fiscal year 2023-24.

== Public Sector Development Programme ==
The budget included funding for a number of development initiatives to increase the nation's economic growth rate. The original outlays for the PDSP being estimated at Rs. 2.66 trillion for the development programme, which included a Rs 950 billion federal Public Sector Development Programme (PSDP), that was approved by the Annual Plan Coordination Committee (APCC). The PDSP would later be further increased to Rs. 2.709 trillion, with Rs. 1.150 trillion being allocated to the Federal Portion, an increase of 58.2% from the previous budget of the development program. The government claimed to alleviate fiscal restrictions and boost sector growth, setting a GDP growth rate of 3.5 percent. Despite claims of the government engaging in "poll politics", seen in the large Federal Development Budget. Ishaq Dar said, "[t]his budget should not be seen as an 'election budget' – it should be seen as a 'responsible budget'"

== Reception from the IMF and Bailout ==
=== IMF Dissatisfaction ===
The 2023-24 Federal Budget would be introduced during times of Polycrisis Crisis in Pakistan. On June 8, Esther Perez Ruiz, the IMF's permanent resident in Pakistan would state that Pakistan would need a convincing budget for any chance of bailout. However, following the initial budget proposals of Ishaq Dar on June 9, the International Monetary Fund (IMF) expressed its dissatisfaction calling them a missed opportunity to broaden the tax base while criticizing the new tax amnesty scheme that "creates a damaging precedent". The IMF would state that the tax amnesty provisions of the budget went against the bailout programme conditionality. On June 25 a revised Budget featuring new taxes, a raised the Petroleum Development Levy (PDL), a lifting of all restrictions on imports and various expenditure cuts were presented to the National Assembly and accepted the next day. These came after talks between Prime Minister Shehbaz Sharif and IMF Managing Director Kristalina Georgieva. Ishaq Dar claimed that the new budget would "make our fiscal deficit much better", adding "I hope, God willing, that we will have an agreement with the IMF." Seeing the raising in Rs. 215 billion in taxes projections and cutting of Rs. 85 billion in spending per IMF demand.

In the fiscal year 2024–25, the Government of Pakistan spent Rs905 billion under the Public Sector Development Programme (PSDP), falling short of both the original budget of Rs1.4 trillion and the revised allocation of Rs1.1 trillion. Notably, over Rs456 billion was spent in just the final two months (May–June), raising concerns about rushed disbursements and inefficient fiscal planning.

The 2.7% GDP growth rate projected for the year was based on the assumption that the entire Rs1.1 trillion would be spent. Officials at the Pakistan Bureau of Statistics (PBS) later acknowledged that the shortfall may necessitate a revision of growth figures.

The underperformance reflects broader economic challenges facing the country, including ballooning public debt, reduced development capacity, and a growing dependence on last-minute budgetary adjustments. Analysts note that such fiscal slippages underscore the day-by-day deterioration of financial discipline and the increasing strain on Pakistan's already fragile economy.

=== Release of Funds ===
Five days after the Federal Budget was first presented to the National Assembly, the IMF would approve its $3 Billion bailout for Pakistan on 30 June. Analysts said that the deal averted the threat of default hanging over the country. This following politically risky measures taken by the Sharif government including raising taxes, reversing subsidies in power and export sectors, increasing energy and fuel prices, agreeing to a market-based currency exchange rate, cutting spending and revising the 2023-24 Federal Budget. Micheal Kugelman writing "Islamabad waited until the very final hour to take the (politically risky) fiscal policy steps that the IMF had been hoping to see for months. If it had taken those steps earlier, much of the drama and fraught negotiations of recent months likely wouldn't have had to play out." The $3 billion in funding would be higher than originally anticipated, with an upfront of $1.1 billion to be disbursed, with the rest in nine-month instalments. The IMF noted that the FY24 budget was "in line with the goals of supporting fiscal sustainability and mobilising revenue, which will enable greater social and development spending." Supporting initiatives to broaden the tax base, increase tax collection from undertaxed sectors, and ensure fiscal space to strengthen fiscal support for the BISP. "It will be important that the budget is executed as planned, and the authorities resist pressures for unbudgeted spending or tax exemptions in the period ahead," the IMF stated.

== Budget Tables ==
Federal Revenue (Rs)			Reference
Class	2022-23	2023-24	
Net Federal Revenue	Rs 4.689 trillion	Rs 6.979 trillion	
National Finance Award	-Rs 4.129 trillion	-Rs 5.399 trillion	
Gross Revenue (FBR+NTR)	Rs 8.818 trillion	Rs 12.378 trillion	
Revenue Receipt (FBR)	Rs 7.200 trillion	Rs 9.415 trillion	
Non Tax Revenue (NTR)	Rs 1.618 trillion	Rs 2.963 trillion	

Federal Expenditure & Deficit (Rs)			Reference
Class	2022-23	2023-24	
Expenditure	Rs 11.090 trillion	Rs 14.485 trillion	
Federal Budget Deficit	Rs 6.400 trillion	Rs 7.505 trillion	
Provincial Surplus	Rs 459 billion	Rs 600 billion	
Overall Fiscal Deficit	Rs 5.941 trillion (7.0% of GDP)	Rs 6.905 trillion (6.53% of GDP)	
Primary Deficit	Rs 421 billion (0.5% of GDP)	Rs 397 billion (0.4 of GDP)	

== Budgetary Policies ==
The following measures were included in the FY2023-24 Budget:

- Rs. 1.1 trillion earmarked for subsidies
- Rs. 761 billion allocated for pensions
- Rs. 22.7 billion earmarked for health sector
- Agriculture credit limit enhanced from Rs1,800 billion to Rs2,250 billion
- Solarisation of 50,000 agriculture tubewells through Rs30 billion
- Withdrawal of all duties and taxes on imported seeds, combined harvesters, dryers and rice planters
- Rs. 10 billion earmarked for PM's Youth Business and Agriculture Loans scheme
- Rs. 6 billion subsidy announced on imported urea
- Targeted subsidy announced on wheat flour, ghee, pulses and rice
- 35% increase in salaries of government servants of grade 1-16 in the form of ad-hoc relief
- 30% increase in salaries of government servants of grade 17-22 in the form of ad-hoc relief
- Tax free imports of software and hardware by IT services equal to 1% of their exports with a ceiling of $50,000
- No sales tax return by freelancers with exports of $2,000 per month
- Increase in Benazir Income Support Programme allocation from Rs400 billion to Rs450 billion
- Upward revision in pensions and increase in minimum pension to Rs12,000
- Rs. 10 billion set aside for provisions of 100,000 laptops for students
- Exemption of custom duty on import of raw material for batteries, solar panels and inverters
- No increase in duties on import of essential items, No new taxes for the upcoming year
- Government will spend Rs1,150 trillion on account of the Public Sector Development Programme
- Exemption of customs duties on import of seeds for sowing for the agricultural sector
- Withdrawal of capping of the fixed duties and taxes on the import of old and used vehicles of Asian Makes above 1300CC
- Increase in defense expenditures to Rs1,804bn, consisting of a 15.4% increase from the previous budget.
- Services provided by restaurants including cafes, food (including ice cream), parlours, coffee houses, coffee shops, deras, food huts, eateries, resorts and similar cooked, prepared or ready-to-eat food service outlets, etc.
  - Proposed to be taxed at 5pc if payment is made through debit or credit cards, mobile wallets or QR scanning.
- Grant of exemption of sales tax on contraceptives and accessories
- Minimum wage proposed at Rs. 32,000; wages of government employees from Grades 1-16 and Grades 17-22 to be increased by 35pc and 30pc, respectively
- Increase in withholding tax rate from 1pc to 5pc on payment to non-residents through debit/credit or prepaid cards
- Exemption of customs duties on import of shrimps/prawns/juvenile for breeding in commercial fish farms and hatcheries
- Rs1 billion allocated for health insurance of working journalists
- Exemepting Custom Duties for Machinery, equipment and inputs for solar panels
- Exempting Foreign Remittances of up to USD 100,000 from the FBR
- Reducing regulatory duties on imported tiles
- Introduction of a new tax regime, the introduction of sales tax provisions in the Federal budget relating to energy transmission and production, exclusion of certain Tier-1 retailers, penalties for non-compliance, exemptions, altering zero-ratings to additional items,
- Increasing the sales tax rate from 12% to 15%, a 1% reduction for the pharmaceutical sector.
- Changes in the Federal Excise Duty (FED), publication of its rules and instructions, introducing FED on certain energy-inefficient appliances, clarification of chargeability, classifying (i) franchise services, (ii) royalties, and (iii) fees for technical services as "Excisable Services" taxed at a rate of 10%.
- Change in the Customs Act, reorganizing Custom authorities, the addition of Provincial Levies and Khasadar Force to list of security agencies required to assist Custom officers in KPK and Balochistan, exemption of certain goods, extending the validation of notifications from June 1, 2016, amendments to the duty structure, mandatory filing of goods declaration, aligning the custom valuation powers with the WTO Valuation Agreement.
- Reducing customs duties and additional customs duties on imports of intermediary/industrial inputs falling under 10 Pakistan Customs Tariff (PCT) codes.

== Reactions and Criticism ==
The IMF in mid-June expressed dissatisfaction with the initial budget, terming it a 'missed opportunity' to broad the tax base in a more progressive way.

=== Business Community Reception ===
Ghias Khan, CEO and President of Engro Corporation said the budget 'enhanced tax burden on the already compliant formal sectors'. Ehsan Malik, CEO of the Pakistan Business Council called it "A budget 'as usual' at times 'unusual'" and criticized the claim of 'no new taxes on industry', citing an increase in super tax. Shahid Habib, CEO of the Arif Habib Group said that the "government should not have allocated a high number on the public sector development programme" and increased salaries and pensions for all employment grades. Musadaq Zulqarnain, Director at Pakistan Textile Council and Chairman at Interloop Holdings called the budget a "balancing act", criticizing tax policy and new tax burdens, however stating that "On the whole (the) budget appears to be reasonable under the given circumstances."

M. Abdul Aleem CEO and Secretary General of the Overseas Investors Chamber of Commerce & Industry (OICCI) said it "appears to be an interim budget with short term measures" but lacking measures to stabilize the economy. However he supported IT, SME and agricultural policies however warned of the snowball effect that the increase in salaries and pensions could have in the economy. Ifran Iqbal Sheikh President of the Federation of Pakistan Chambers of Commerce and Industry (FPCCI) said it "presents an unrealistic picture of the economy, and, therefore the budgetary targets set in the budget documents are unrealistic as well."

Criticising the revenue target of Rs. 9,200bn. Mustafa Pasha, CIO at Lakson Investments, said "The budget is unlikely to improve chances of an SLA in June" with the IMF. Shahbaz Ashraf CIO at Frim Ventures called it "A budget that the IMF would approve of", criticizing the lack of control on fiscal expenditures, increase in pensions and salaries, high-interest payments, increase in super-taxes and withholding taxes on withdrawals, terming it a "plain-vanilla budget". Fahad Rauf, Head of Research at Ismail Iqbal Securities stated that "it does not seem like an election budget" other than pension and salaries increases. Gohar Ejaz, Patron-in-Chief of APTMA claimed that the budget was based on reviving the IMF programme and stated the regional energy price budget, with its cross-subsidies, general collection and distribution losses is "something the export industry cannot sustain." Defense economics analyst Fida Muhammad Khan dismissed calls for defense cuts. Tuaha Adil stated that Pakistan's spending plans are concerning but necessary due to the TTP.

=== Finance Community Reception ===
Political economist Uzair Younus claimed "this budget is evidence that this government has given up on trying to rescue the economy. The goal is to kick the can down the road, let whoever is in power later this year deal with the fallout of this ongoing crisis." Journalist Mehtab Haider stated that the budget numbers "unrealistic", especially non-tax revenues. Economist Ali Farid Khwaja however instead held "so far, it looks like an honest budget rather than a populist or unreal budget which the previous ones [have been]." Dr Asma Hyder supported the budgets freelancer and IT export programs, "The budget speech by the finance minister reflects that the economy is probably intended to move towards more liberalization with reduced taxation, import duties, and easy loans for productive activities — which is not bad. There are many encouraging initiatives, such as eliminating import duty on solar panel batteries and imported seeds, and no new tax on industry and agricultural machines," she added. However, she criticized the increase in the PSDP, HEC, laptop scheme and ambiguousness of debt repayment.

Economist Ali Hasnain said that the budget mirrored old PML(N) policies with "no new ideas," adding "In sum, the country's leadership and in particular this economic team look devoid of intent and ideas." According to Senior journalist Afshan Subohi "Dar presented a Rs14.5 trillion tax-free election budget without backing it up with convincing revenue streams." Remaining neutral on promised relief measures but criticised the pensions and pay increase of government employees "[they] may be good but it leaves the majority to cope with the economic difficulties on their own," stating that they make only less than 2% of the population of 241 million dealing with historically highest inflation rates. Remarking "All in all, the budget is more of the same." Khaleeq Kiani called the Federal budget a 'Populist' measure in 'trying times.' Ikram Junaidi criticized the increase of only Rs. 1.72 billion for healthcare expenditure, despite numerous indicators of below-standard performance.

The imposition of a 10% final tax on the issuance of bonus shares, a 0.6% advance tax on withdrawals for non-filers, and increasing textile sales taxes on retail point-of-sale (POS) of textiles and leather products was criticised for disincentivizing market activity and promoting the black market, but praised for "Encouraging Remittances and Currency Stability" and reducing import duties and exemptions by Aneel Salman of Friedrich Naumann Foundation.

=== Government Reception ===
Finance Secretary Imdad Ullah Bosal claimed that the Budget Statement describes "the government's response to the afore-mentioned challenges, in the shape of substantial pro-poor allocations for marginalized segments of society, austerity measures curtailing unnecessary government expenditure and investments in agriculture, industries and IT sectors to cater to the needs of economic recovery and growth." Ishaq Dar in his Budgetary speech would claim that "the country has truly been saved from default, taken out of crisis and brought to the path of stability."

== See also ==
- Pakistani economic crisis (2022–present)
- First Shehbaz Sharif ministry
- Pakistani budgets
- Ishaq Dar
- Pakistan Bureau of Statistics
- Ministry of Finance (Pakistan)
- Pakistan and the International Monetary Fund
