= Sahm (surname) =

Sahm is a surname. Notable people with the surname include:

- Claudia Sahm, American economist
- Doug Sahm (1941–1999), American musician and singer-songwriter
- Heinrich Sahm (1877–1939), German lawyer and politician
- Shandon Sahm (born 1969), American drummer
