= Claudia Sahm =

American economist (born 1976)

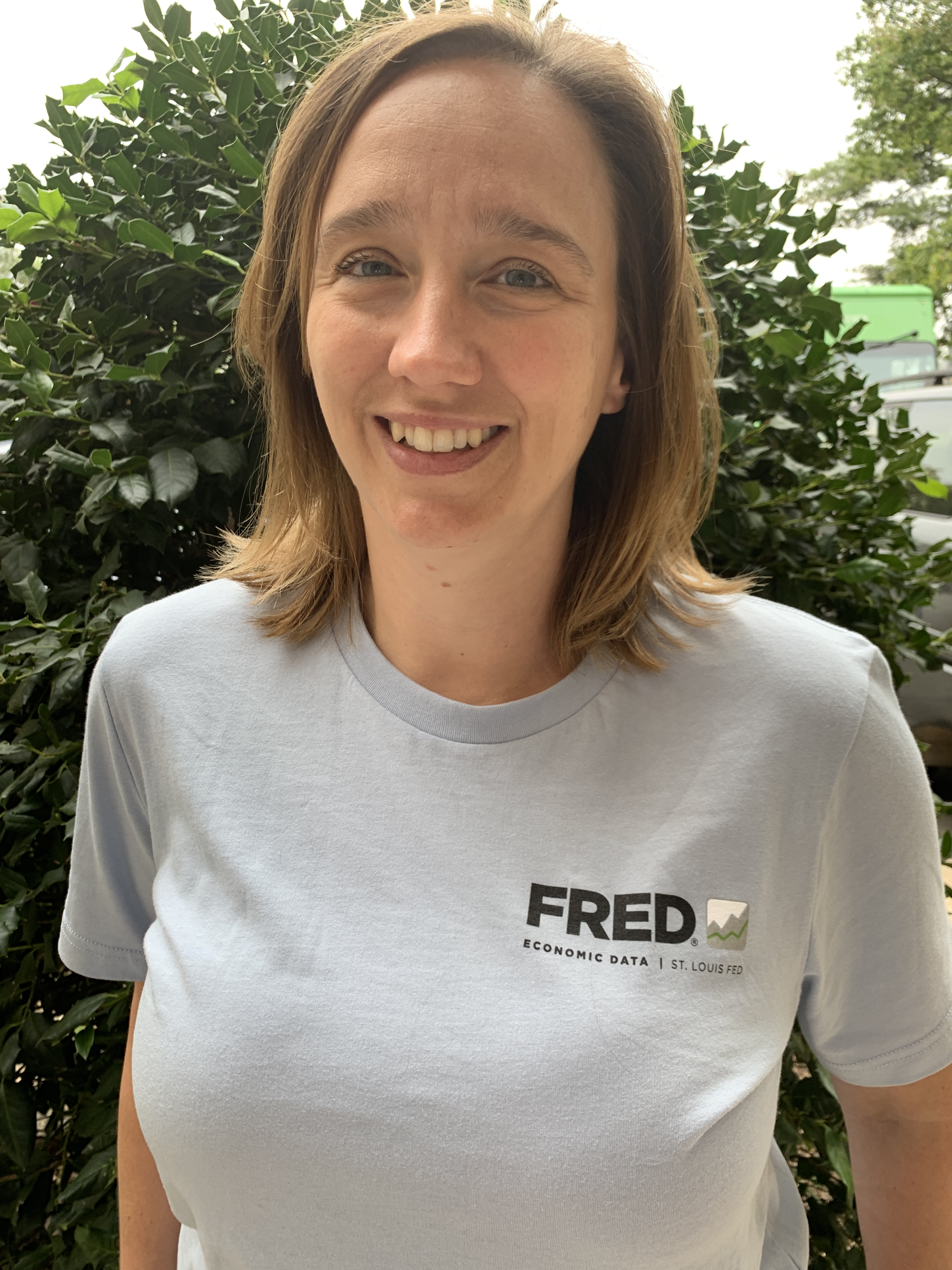
- Born: Claudia Foster; March 13, 1976 (age 50)
- Education: Denison University (BA); University of Michigan (MA, PhD)
- Known for: Sahm rule
- Children: 2
- Scientific career
- Workplaces: Brookings Institution; Federal Reserve Board of Governors; Washington Center for Equitable Growth
- Website: Official website

Claudia Rae Sahm (née Foster, born March 13, 1976) is an American economist, currently serving as Chief Economist for New Century Advisors. She is also the founder of Sahm Consulting. Claudia was formerly director of macroeconomic policy at the Washington Center for Equitable Growth, and a Section Chief at the Board of Governors of the Federal Reserve System, where she worked in various capacities from 2007 to 2019. Sahm specializes in macroeconomics and household finance. She is best known for the development of the Sahm rule, a Federal Reserve Economic Data (FRED) indicator for identifying recessions in real-time.

== Education and career ==
In 1998, Sahm received a bachelor's degree in economics from Denison University, where she also studied political science and German. From 1998 to 1999, Sahm was a Fulbright Scholar at the Technical University of Dresden, where she studied economic transitions in post-socialist countries. From 1999 to 2001, Sahm worked at the Brookings Institution as a research assistant. Sahm began her PhD at the University of Michigan in 2001, guided by Matthew D. Shapiro and Miles Spencer Kimball, completing her thesis Risk Tolerance and Asset Allocation in 2007.

In 2007, Sahm began working at the Federal Reserve Board of Governors as an economist, where her work was focused on examining consumer spending. Her first position was studying the impact of tax rebates. In 2013 she was promoted to Senior Economist, and in 2015 to Principal Economist, at the Federal Reserve Board of Governors.

Sahm was a Senior Economist at the Council of Economic Advisers for the Obama administration, where she worked on macroeconomic developments and housing policy from 2015 to 2016. She studied the impact of unusual weather on economic data. She showed that people were less willing to take economic risks as they age.

In September 2017 Sahm was promoted to Section Chief of the Federal Reserve Board of Governors in the Division of Consumer and Community Affairs. From October 2019 to September 2020, she was director of macroeconomic policy at the Washington Center for Equitable Growth. In September 2020, Sahm joined Bloomberg Opinion as a contributor and in October 2020, she joined The New York Times as a Contributing Opinion Writer.

As of 2022, Sahm is a senior fellow leading Macroeconomic Research at the Jain Family Institute. She is also a member of the National Bureau of Economic Research Conference on Research in Income and Wealth.

In April 2024, Sahm accepted the role of Chief Economist at New Century Advisors.

=== Research ===
This graph shows the fluctuations of the Sahm Rule indicator, created using the publicly available data on the FRED database from the Federal Reserve Bank.

Sahm conducts research in macroeconomics with a focus on business cycles, fiscal stimulus and consumer behavior.

Her research has appeared in numerous FEDS notes, books, and major academic journals.

Outside the academic audience Sahm is known for the Sahm rule, also known as the "Sahm Recession Indicator":

One reliable early signal of recession is the Sahm Rule: A downturn is probably occurring if the three-month average of the unemployment rate has risen by at least 0.5 percentage point above its low point in the previous 12 months. This rule [...] has signaled every recession since 1970 with virtually no false positives.

The Sahm rule tracks the unemployment rate to detect upcoming and current recessions.

==== Selected publications ====
- Bosworth, Barry; Burtless, Gary; Sahm, Claudia (2004). "Distributional Impact of Social Security Reform". In Onofri, Paolo (ed.). The Economics of an Ageing Population: Macroeconomic Issues. Cheltenham, UK and Northampton, MA: Edward Elgar Publications. pp. 193–226. doi:10.4337/9781845421601.00014. ISBN 978-1-843-76779-4. OCLC 5149471599.
- Kimball, Miles S; Sahm, Claudia R; Shapiro, Matthew D (January 2012). "Imputing Risk Tolerance From Survey Responses" (PDF). Journal of the American Statistical Association. 103 (483): 1028–1038. doi:10.1198/016214508000000139. PMC 2856097. PMID 20407599.
- Sahm, Claudia R. (2007). Risk Tolerance and Asset Allocation (PDF) (PhD). University of Michigan. OCLC 894382254.
- Kimball, Miles S; Sahm, Claudia R; Shapiro, Matthew D (April 2009). "Risk Preferences in the PSID: Individual Imputations and Family Covariation" (PDF). American Economic Review: Papers and Proceedings. 99 (2): 363–368. doi:10.1257/aer.99.2.363. PMC 2995549. PMID 21132079.
- Larrimore, Jeff; Durante, Alex; Kreiss, Kimberly; Merry, Ellen; Park, Christina; Sahm, Claudia (22 May 2018). "Shedding Light on Our Economic and Financial Lives". FEDS Notes. 2018 (2192). doi:10.17016/2380-7172.2192.
- Aladangady, Aditya; Aron-Dine, Shifrah; Cashin, David; Dunn, Wendy; Feiveson, Laura; Lengermann, Paul; Richard, Katherine; Sahm, Claudia (21 June 2018). "High-frequency Spending Responses to the Earned Income Tax Credit". FEDS Notes. 2018 (2199). doi:10.17016/2380-7172.2199.

=== Other work ===
Sahm maintains the economics blog MacroMom and economics newsletter Stay-At-Home Macro.

Sahm campaigns for more diversity in economics. She petitioned the American Economic Association to remove sexist comments on the website Economics Job Market Rumors (EJMR). She is also known for her critiques of the culture of the economics profession, citing many specific examples of bullying and harassment she experienced, observed, or had reported to her by others, often directed at female and minority economists.

== Personal life ==
Sahm was married to Patrick Sahm, whom she met at Denison University, and with whom she has two children. She married health economist Colin Baker in 2020.

== Awards ==
- 1998: Fulbright Association, Fulbright Research Grant
- 2006: Institute for Social Research, Innovation in Social Research Award
