= Miles Kimball =

American economist

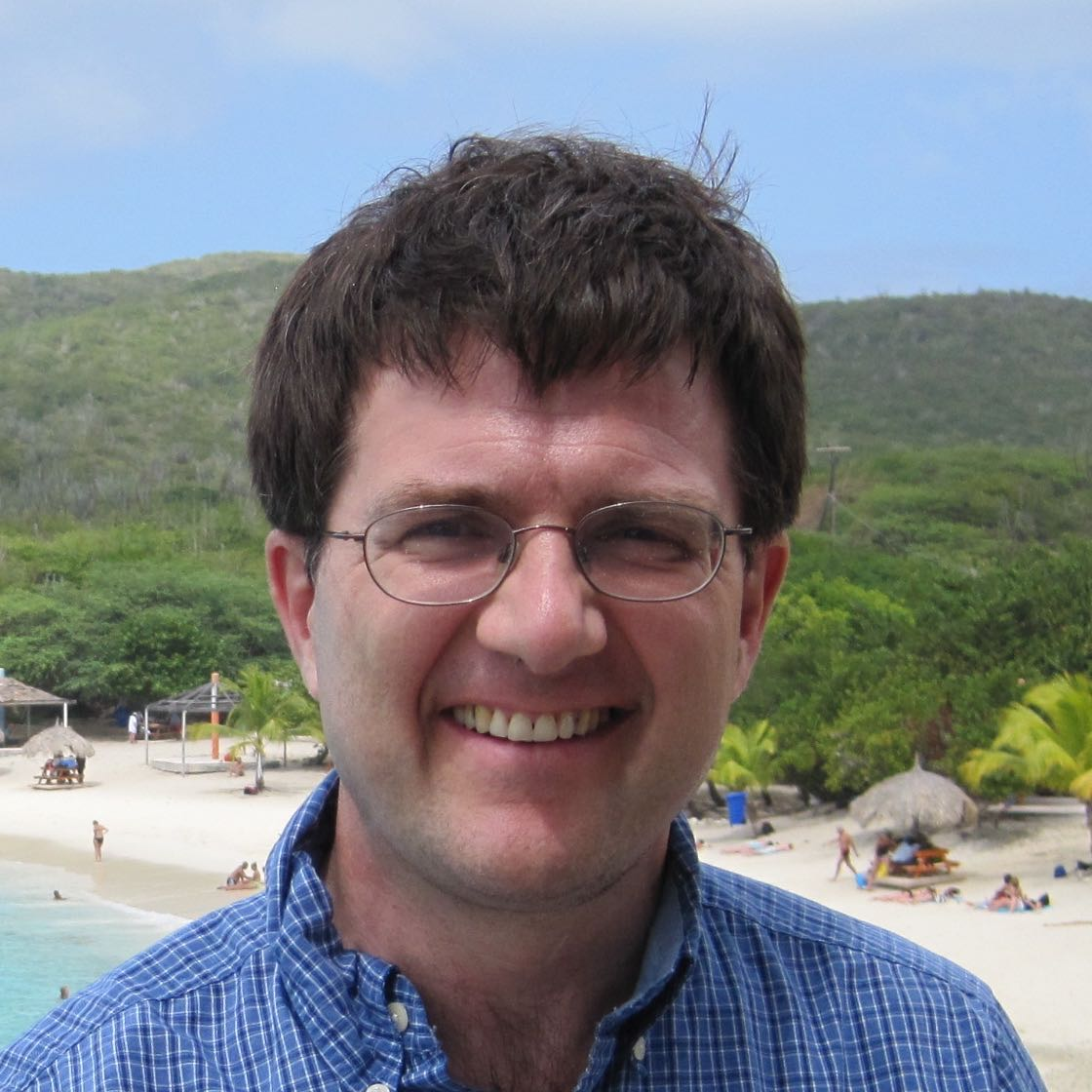
Kimball in 2010

Miles Spencer Kimball is an American economist who is currently the Eugene D. Eaton Jr. Professor of Economics at the University of Colorado Boulder. From 1987 to 2016, he was professor of economics and research professor of survey research at the University of Michigan. He is also a research associate of the National Bureau of Economics Research.

== Biography ==
Kimball was born to Edward Lawrence Kimball and Evelyn Bee Madsen Kimball on August 17, 1960. He is the grandson of Spencer W. Kimball, the twelfth president of the Church of Jesus Christ of Latter-day Saints and great-nephew of chemist Henry Eyring. As a high school senior, Kimball took 9th place in the USA Math Olympiad. Kimball graduated with a bachelor's degree in economics from Harvard University in 1982. He then received a master's degree in linguistics from Brigham Young University in 1984. His Master's thesis was "Language, Linguistics and Philosophy: A Comparison of the Work of Roman Jakobson and the Later Wittgenstein, with Some Attention to the Philosophy of Charles Saunders Peirce." In 1987, he graduated with a Ph.D. in economics from Harvard and won the David A. Wells prize for the best Harvard dissertation in economics. He became an assistant professor at University of Michigan in 1987 and an associate professor in 1993. In 1999 he also became research professor at the University of Michigan's Survey Research Center. He gave the H. Chase Stone Lecture at Colorado College in 2009, held the Jon M. Huntsman Presidential Visiting Professorship at Utah State University in May 2011, and gave the Geneva Risk Economics Lecture in September, 2013. He gave one of two keynote speeches at the Bank of England Chief Economists' Workshop on "The Future of Money" in May 2015.

Kimball married Gail Cozzens on August 24, 1984.

== Research contribution ==
His general areas of expertise are macroeconomics and cognitive economics.

He is especially known for his work in the areas of precautionary saving and survey measurement of preference parameters. Kimball (1990) first defined the prudence index to measure the intensity of the precautionary motive. He was also awarded the Samuelson Prize Certificate of Excellence for his work in survey measurement of preference parameters. He also has published well cited articles often in the fields of labor market dynamics, and the economics of uncertainty.

He was a columnist for the online international business magazine Quartz, where his column coauthored with Noah Smith, "There is one key difference between kids who excel at math and those who don't" was the second most popular article in 2013.

== Interests ==
Kimball is a Unitarian-Universalist lay preacher after having departed from the Church of Jesus Christ of Latter-day Saints (LDS Church) around the age of 40 (circa 2000).

In 2016, Kimball began to give sustained attention to nutrition and fasting, arising from a personal quest to manage his own weight and health. He has collected significant resources on these topics, much of which he has made available online. He has declared Canadian nephrologist Jason Fung's book The Obesity Code (2016) to be the fifth and latest of the five books that have changed his life.
