= Federal budget (economics) =

Estimated future revenues and spending of the federal government

In economics, a federal budget is the major plan for a federal government's estimated future revenues and spending for the coming fiscal year. The federal budget is representation of the financial plan for the goals and activities of the government which in turn reflects the debates surrounding the various economical principles and ideas. It is the main means of the redistribution of the national income and gross domestic product to meet the needs necessary in order for economic growth. Primarily, the government spends a significant amount of their financial resources in the areas of healthcare, the old and young and social security programs.

== Overview ==
The revenue for the federal budget each fiscal year is arranged and administered by the government and is then supplied in the form of taxation. These taxes can come in a wide variety of sources such as a tax on one's income, profits from a business and the country's imports (duties and tariffs). Revenue can also be streamed from activities that the government strongly discourages often called a Sin tax and the government can then tax on commodities such as smoking and alcohol consumption. Federal governments don't necessarily exist in every country due to it largely depending on the size and population of the country. The United Kingdom currently doesn't require federal governments but in the United States for example this model is needed as there exists mass population throughout the country in addition to the diverse group of people with diverse needs but federal government suits due to the common culture and values set in place.

== How federal budget is spent ==
Federal governments splits up the federal budget into three main categories; mandatory spending, discretionary spending and interest on debt. Both mandatory and discretionary spending makes up 90% of the entire federal budget spend.

=== Mandatory spending ===
Mandatory spending is government spending on different mandatory programs that are outside the annual supply bill process and usually occurs less than once in a year. Departments such as social security and medicare normally dominate the mandatory spend. Budget estimates the required costs to administer the following benefits. It cannot be changed without another Act Of Congress. The largest federal spend is in the area of social security which benefits the retired, disabled and their families. In the United States it makes up around 21% of the overall total spend and it is required by the legislation in the law so therefore it is mandatory.

=== Discretionary spending ===
Discretionary spending is government spending that is implemented through a supply bill or more commonly known as an appropriation bill. These spending levels are then set by the congress on a yearly basis and it funds the management of all the government agencies and activities. This type of spending forms a part of fiscal policy and is a contrast to the programs that are mandatory where people can be entitled to benefits if they are eligible.

=== Interest on debt ===
Interest on debt is the cost incurred by an entity for borrowed funds. This is a non-operating expense shown on the income statement and it represents the interest payable on any borrowings – bonds, loans, convertible debt or lines of credit.

== Development of the federal budget ==
The largest federal budgets are in the United States and the development of their federal budgets is made up of a very significant and detailed nine-step plan that the United States Congress use to create the plan. The process starts a full year ahead before the fiscal year begins. The fiscal year in the United States starts on the 1st of October and runs through until September 30th year this means that the budget for 2018 began in the fall of 2016.

The federal budgets in the United States are like Germany and Australian federal governments as they normally run a deficit and this is down to the economies engaging in expansionary policy. in the United States, it is the president's role to submit the budget the proposal to the United States Congress. The president would then ask the federal agencies to submit their budgets requests directly to him. The president then submits the budget and requests to congress where it is used as a base guideline for its own budget resolution. This is then used to create appropriation or supply bills and these bills then allocate the available funds to the different fields of federal agencies.

== See also ==
- Fiscal policy
- Fiscal year
- Office of Management and Budget
- Congressional Budget Office
- Contractionary monetary policy
- Expansionary monetary policy
- Government spending
- Taxation
