= October 1929 =

Month of 1929

<<	October 1929					>>
Su	Mo	Tu	We	Th	Fr	Sa
		1	2	3	4	5
6	7	8	9	10	11	12
13	14	15	16	17	18	19
20	21	22	23	24	25	26
27	28	29	30	31

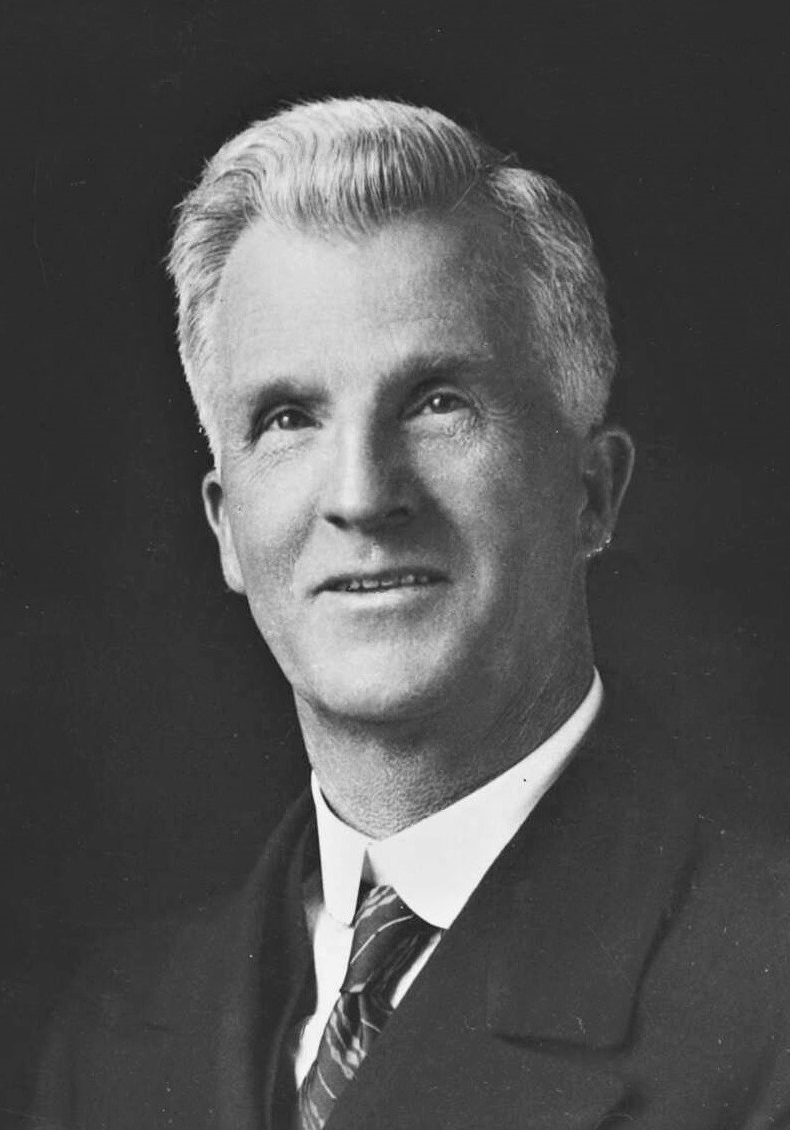
October 12, 1929: James Scullin wins election to become new Prime Minister of Australia

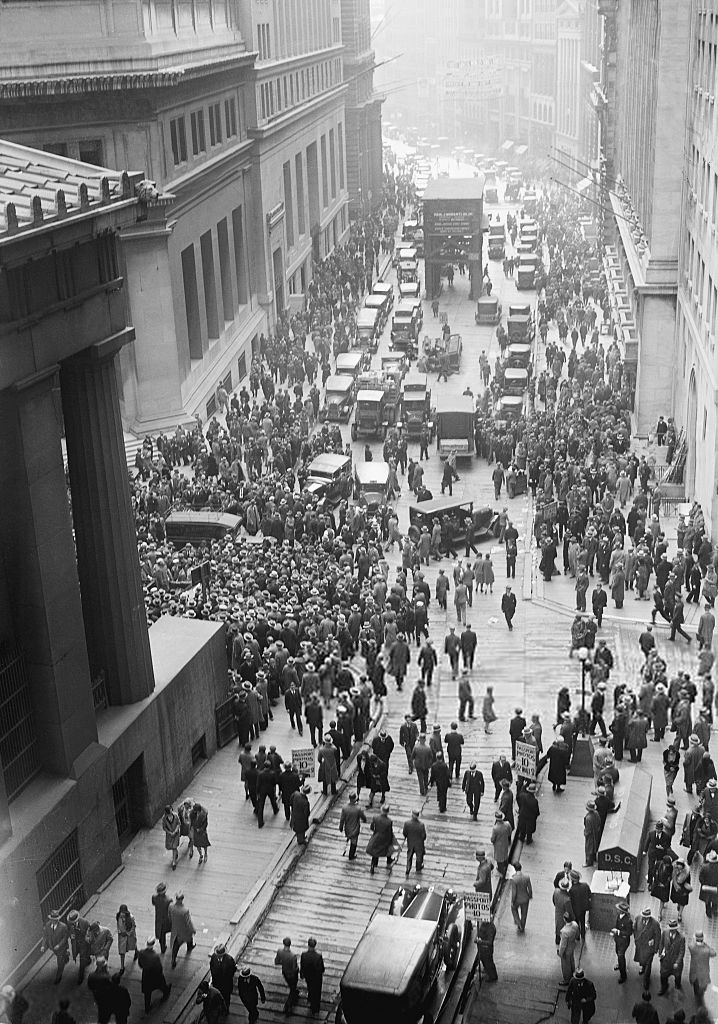
October 24, 1929: Panic selling begins on Wall Street when the New York Stock Exchange opens as investors scramble to pay "margin calls", a day commemorated as "Black Thursday" and as the start of the Great Depression

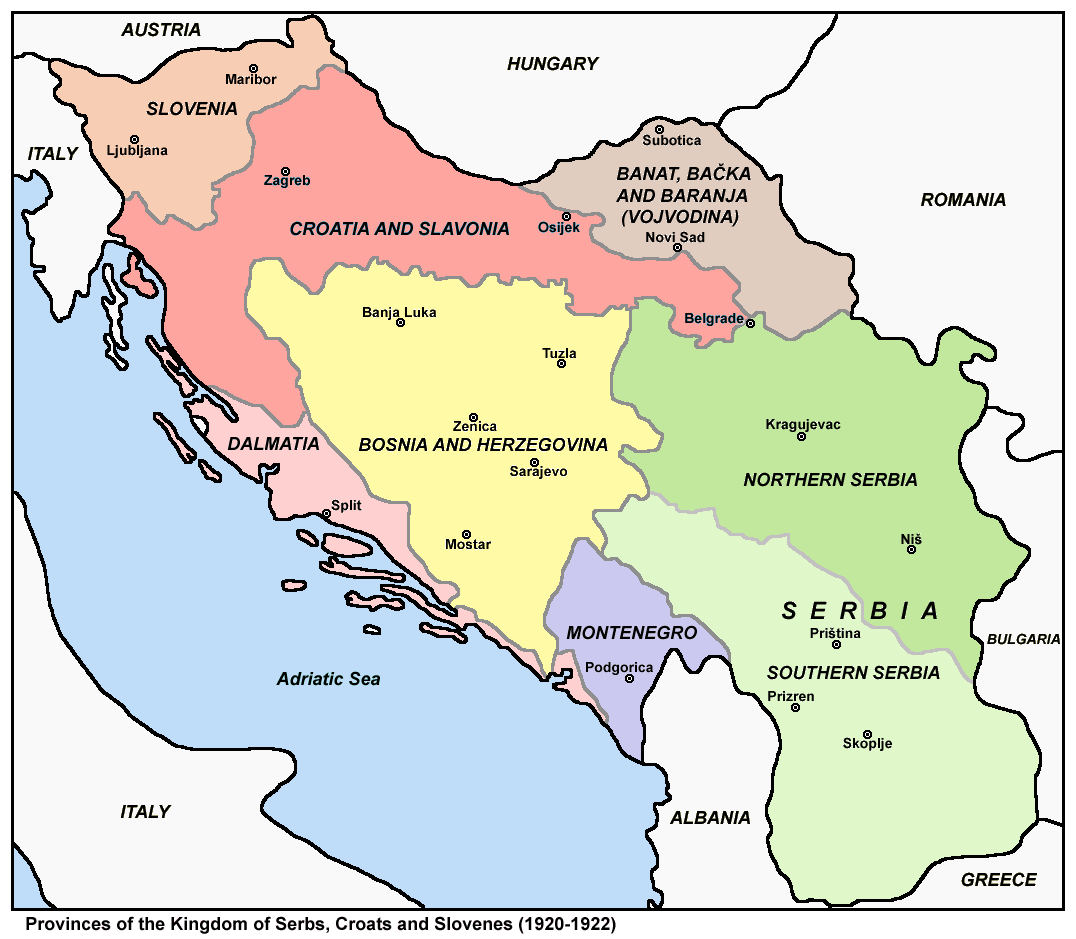
October 3, 1929: The Kingdom of the Serbs, Croats and Slovenes officially shortens name to "Yugoslavia"

The following events occurred in October 1929:

== Tuesday, October 1, 1929 ==
- Britain restored diplomatic relations with the Soviet Union.
- Died: Antoine Bourdelle, 67, French sculptor, painter and teacher

== Wednesday, October 2, 1929 ==
- In Marion, North Carolina six people were killed and 25 wounded when special deputies, allegedly drunk, opened fire on striking mill workers.
- Britain set up a national committee to consider establishing national parks.
- The talking historical film Disraeli, starring George Arliss as the nineteenth century British prime minister Benjamin Disraeli, premiered at the Warner's Theatre in New York.
- Born: Moses Gunn, actor, in St. Louis, Missouri (d. 1993)

== Thursday, October 3, 1929 ==
- The country officially known as the Kingdom of the Serbs, Croats and Slovenes changed its name to the Kingdom of Yugoslavia.
- The biggest prison riot in the history of Colorado State Penitentiary began when a failed escape attempt by two inmates turned into a hostage situation. The National Guard, civilian volunteers and police from nearby districts were called in and prepared to lay siege.

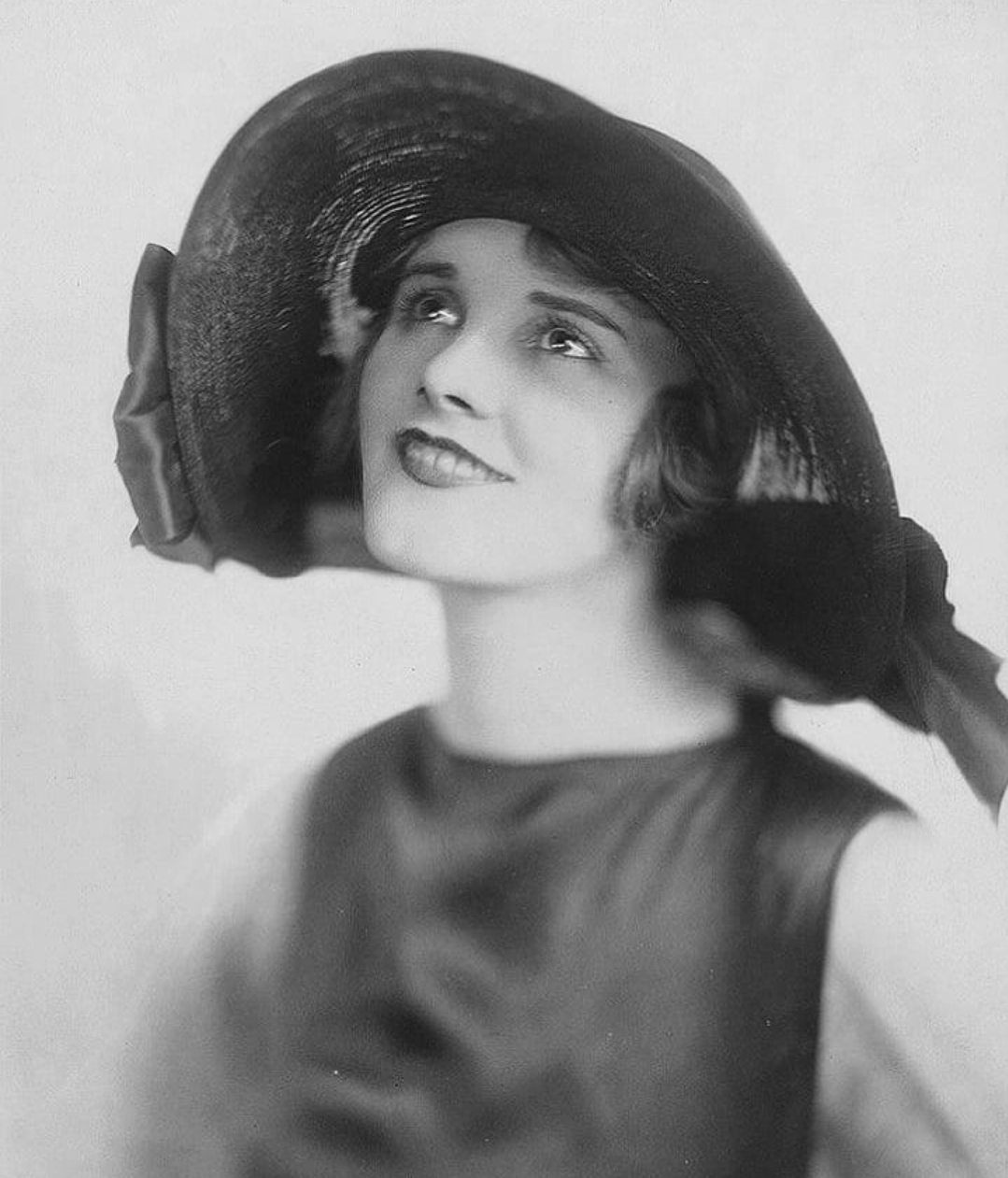
Film star Jeanne Eagels

- Chinese and Soviet troops battled for Manzhouli.
- The musical film Sunny Side Up, starring Janet Gaynor and Charles Farrell, premiered at the Gaiety Theatre in New York City.
- Mahatma Gandhi visited Azamgarh, where he addressed a meeting of about 75,000 persons at Srikrishna Pathsala High School.
- Died:
  - Jeanne Eagels, 39, American film actress, died of an overdose of the sedative chloral hydrate, in conjunction with heroin and alcohol
  - Gustav Stresemann, 51, Foreign Minister of Germany since 1923, died of a stroke

== Friday, October 4, 1929 ==
- The Colorado State Penitentiary riot ended in the early morning with its leaders all dead. With the prospects of escape clearly hopeless, one of the leaders shot his accomplices and then himself. In all, eight prison guards and five inmates were killed.

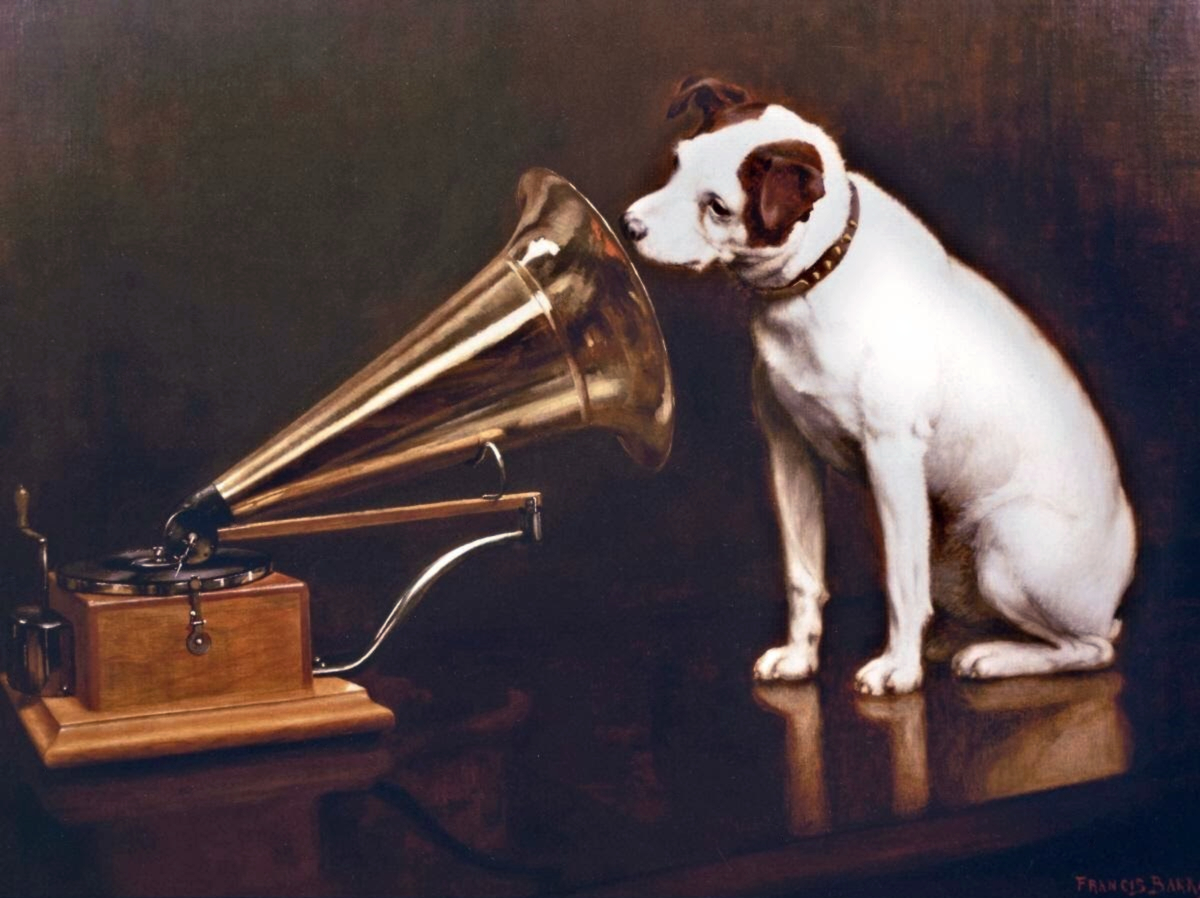
RCA Victor

- The Victor Talking Machine Company was merged with RCA to form RCA-Victor, with RCA holding 50 percent of the stock, General Electric 30 percent, and Westinghouse Electric 20 percent.
- Ramsay MacDonald arrived in New York City and proceeded to Washington, D.C., by train, where he had an introductory 20-minute meeting with President Herbert Hoover. MacDonald became the first sitting British prime minister to ever visit the United States.
- The Fritz Lang-directed silent science fiction film Frau im Mond (Woman in the Moon) premiered in Berlin.

== Saturday, October 5, 1929 ==
- Ramsay MacDonald and Herbert Hoover retreated to Rapidan Camp for disarmament talks.
- The body of Gustav Stresemann lay in state at the Reichstag.

== Sunday, October 6, 1929 ==
- Gustav Stresemann was given a state funeral.
- General Pyotr Nikolayevich Wrangel, who died in April 1928, was reburied in Belgrade, Serbia, in accordance with his wishes.
- Fifty-three-year-old Nick Altrock, a coach for the Washington Senators, was inserted into a meaningless game at the end of the season against the Boston Red Sox as something of a lark. Altrock hit a single in his only at-bat of the game and became one of the few men in major league history to get a hit past the age of 50: Jim O'Rourke, Charley O'Leary and Minnie Miñoso are the only others to accomplish the feat.

== Monday, October 7, 1929 ==
- The sinking of the Norwegian passenger ship Haakon VII killed 44 passengers and crew after the vessel struck a rock near Florø and sank. Another 69 people were rescued.
- Sir Francis Humphrys was appointed High Commissioner for Iraq by the British government.
- Back in Washington, D.C., Ramsay MacDonald addressed the United States Senate with a 20-minute speech about world peace and disarmament.
- The backstage musical film Applause premiered at the Criterion Theatre in New York City.
- Born: Tony Beckley, English actor; in Southampton (d. 1980)
- Died: Esteban Gallard, 28, popular Cuban boxer who competed under the name Kid Charol, died of tuberculosis

== Tuesday, October 8, 1929 ==
- Mobster Ralph Capone was arrested by federal authorities for tax fraud.
- Stephen Koenig Armstrong and Viola Louise Engel were married in the living room of the Ohio farmhouse of William Ernst Kornspeter, Viola's stepfather. Their first child, future astronaut Neil Armstrong, would be born on August 5, 1930.
- Cuban airline Cubana de Aviación was founded.

== Wednesday, October 9, 1929 ==
- The George S. Kaufman and Ring Lardner stage play June Moon opened at the Broadhurst Theatre on Broadway.

== Thursday, October 10, 1929 ==
- The troops of General Nadir Khan took Kabul in the Afghan civil war, who then proclaimed himself the new King of Afghanistan.
- Died: Elijah McCoy, 86, Canadian-American inventor

== Friday, October 11, 1929 ==
- By two votes, the U.S. Senate eased American censorship laws by passing an amendment to a tariff bill to exempt books and pamphlets from a ban on the importation of obscene content (restrictions against other media, such as paintings and photographs, remained in place). However, the amendment included a new prohibition against books or drawings urging forcible resistance to the laws of the United States or threats against any American's life. The amendment would be revoked in March 1930.

== Saturday, October 12, 1929 ==
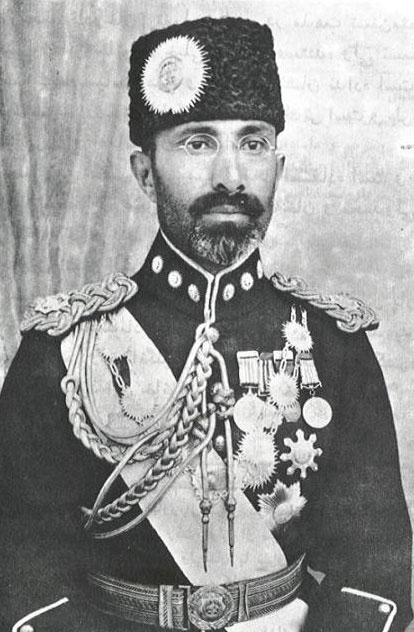
Afghanistan's new King, Mohammed Nadir Shah

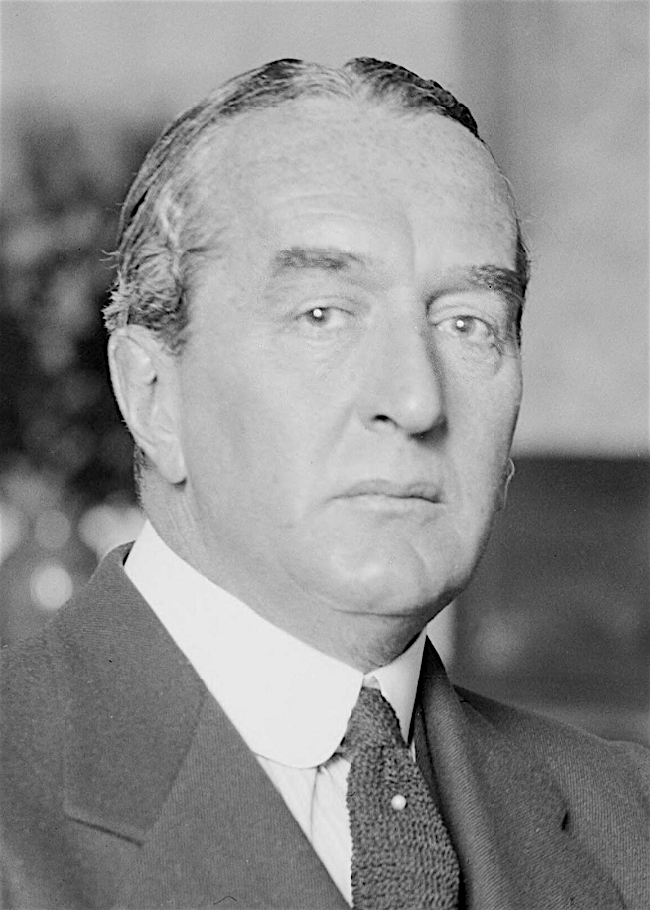
Australia's Prime Minister Bruce, voted out

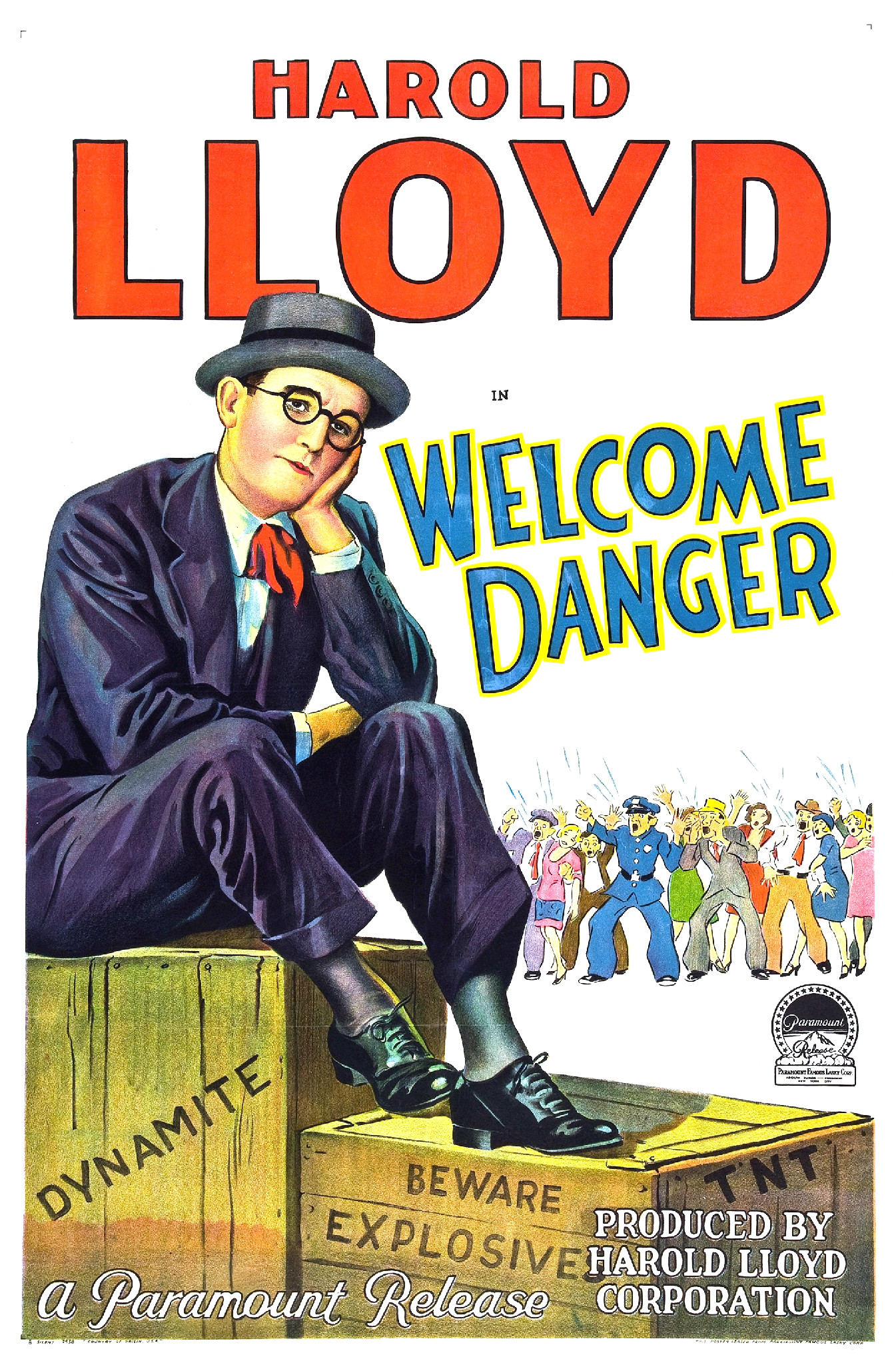

- Elections were held for the 75 seats of the Australian House of Representatives. The Australian Labor Party, led by James Scullin, gained 15 seats to win a majority of 46. The Nationalist/Country coalition government of Prime Minister Stanley Bruce lost its 42 to 31 majority, dropping 24 seats, and Scullin replaced Bruce as the head of the Australian government.
- In Game Four of the World Series, the Philadelphia Athletics mounted the biggest comeback in World Series history, overcoming an eight-run deficit to beat the Chicago Cubs 10 to 8. Hack Wilson became the goat of the series by losing two fly balls in the sun during the Athletics' seventh inning rally.
- The German government issued a warning against the anti-Young Plan referendum campaign, calling it a "monstrous attempt to incite the German people against the government and to annihilate the ten-year goodwill policy of the republic with Germany's former enemies."
- The comedy film Welcome Danger, Harold Lloyd's first talkie, was released.

== Sunday, October 13, 1929 ==
- The ocean liner RMS Empress of Canada ran aground off Vancouver Island during a fog. All 96 passengers were safely transferred ashore by another ship.
- Born: Walasse Ting, Chinese-American artist and poet, in Shanghai (d. 2010)

== Monday, October 14, 1929 ==
- The Philadelphia Athletics won the World Series four games to one over the Chicago Cubs, taking Game Five by a 3–2 score at Shibe Park.

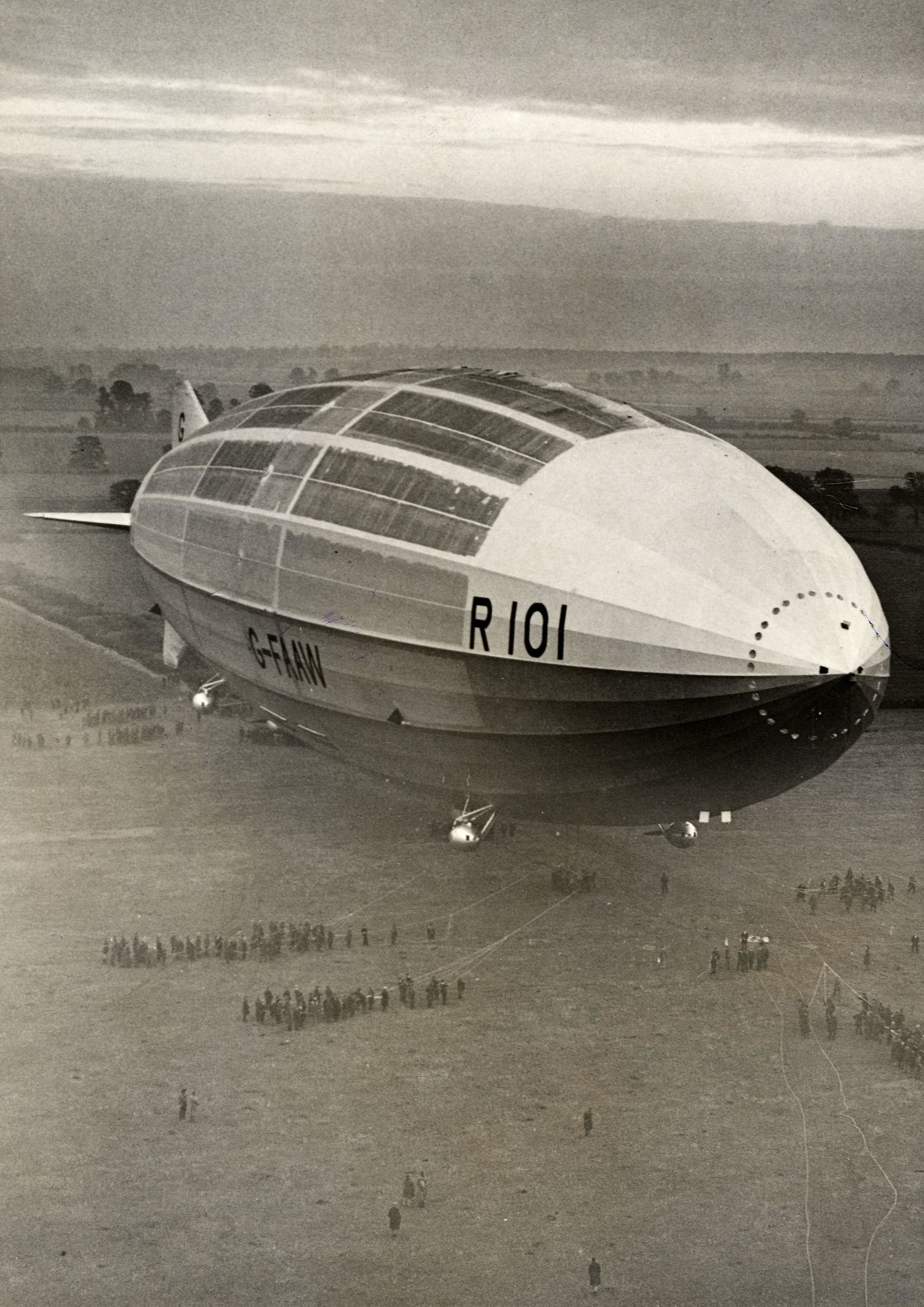
R101 over Britain

- The British airship R101 embarked on its maiden voyage. Traffic in London came to a standstill as thousands stopped to watch the dirigible pass over the city.

== Tuesday, October 15, 1929 ==
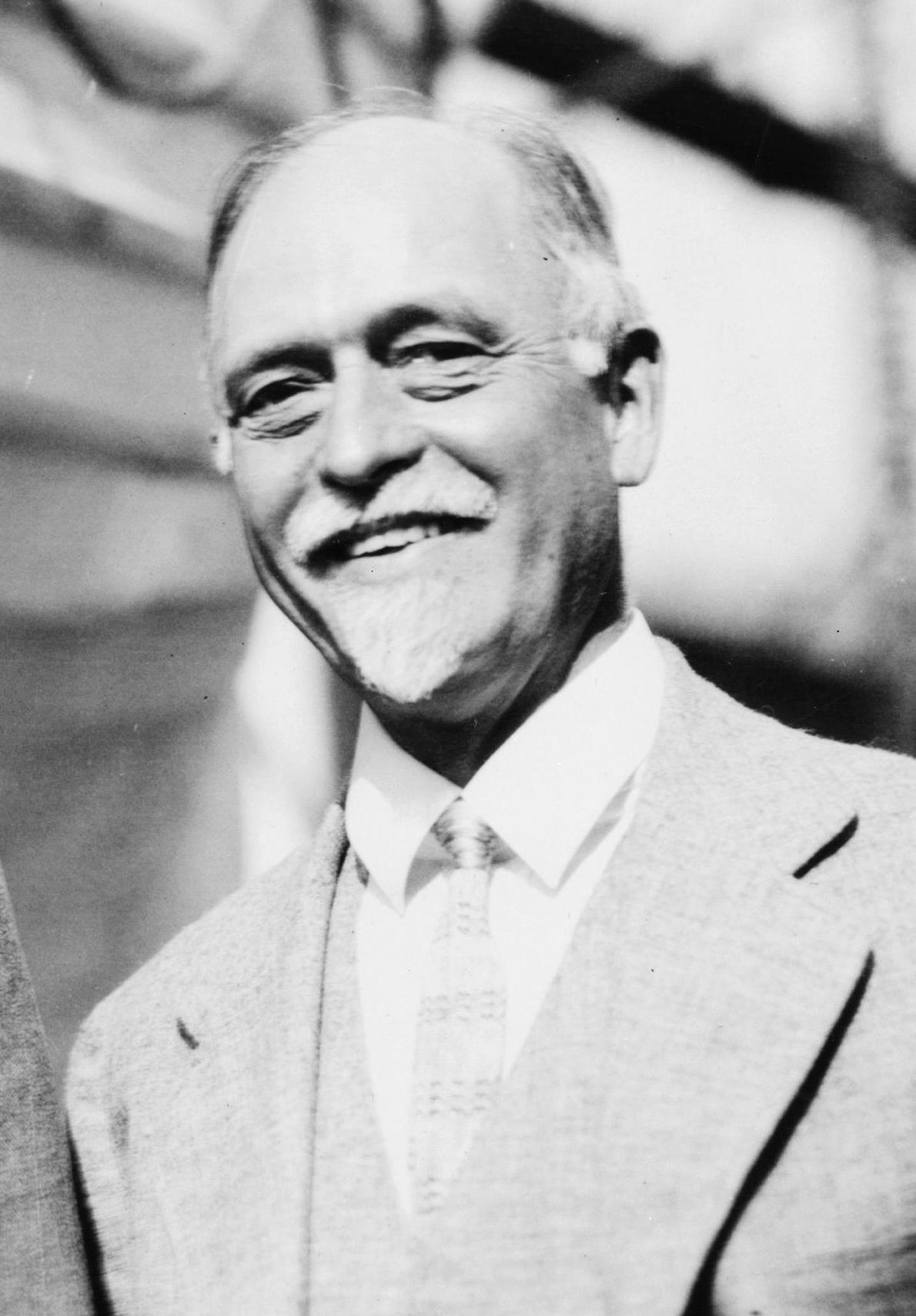
Optimist Irving Fisher

- American economist Irving Fisher told a dinner meeting audience in New York City that stock prices had reached "what looks like a permanently high plateau" and that he expected "to see the stock market a good deal higher than it is today within a few months."
- Ramsay MacDonald crossed into Canada at Niagara Falls and traveled to Toronto.
- Mohammed Nadir Shah became King of Afghanistan as the country's civil war ended.
- Born: Antonino Zichichi, physicist, in Trapani, Sicily

== Wednesday, October 16, 1929 ==
- Lists were opened in Germany for the signing of a petition for a national referendum to deny Germany's war guilt and refuse to obey the Young Plan. 10% of all the country's eligible voters would be required to sign up before the referendum could be considered binding.
- The British government made a concession to the country's coal miners by informing their unions that there would be a uniform reduction of work hours from eight down to seven-and-a-half per day without reduction of wages. The miners had sought repeal of the Coal Mines Regulation Act 1908 (8 Edw. 7. c. 57) – the 'Eight Hour Act' – passed by the Stanley Baldwin government and reversion to the old seven-hour day.
- The Dow Jones Industrial Average dropped 3.2% as the New York Stock Exchange posted widespread losses, with numerous declines of 10 points or more.
- Born: S. William Green, politician, in New York City (d. 2002)

== Thursday, October 17, 1929 ==
- Anti-Italian demonstrations were held all over Yugoslavia as Italian authorities executed a Serbian student by firing squad for being part of a group that fired into a line of electors in Pazin on election day, killing a Fascist.
- Ramsay MacDonald arrived in Ottawa to meet with Canadian prime minister William Lyon Mackenzie King.
- The New York Stock Exchange posted a small gain of 1.7% on an uncertain day with many fluctuations.

== Friday, October 18, 1929 ==
- The Privy Council of England made a landmark decision recognizing women as "persons" under the law in Canada, giving them the right to be appointed to the Senate. The decision was a victory for five Alberta women— Henrietta Muir Edwards, Nellie McClung, Louise McKinney, Emily Murphy, and Irene Parlby— known as "The Famous Five". October 18 is now commemorated as Persons Day in Canada.
- A group of 100 protesters in Brussels rioted and threw stones at the Italian embassy in opposition to the news of the engagement of Princess Marie José to Crown Prince Umberto of Italy. The engagement was unpopular in Belgium because Italian leader Benito Mussolini was disliked there. Police dispersed the rioters by firing over their heads.
- Several battalions of Chinese troops mutinied at Wuhu.
- The Dow Jones declined again, losing 2.51% on the New York Stock Exchange.

== Saturday, October 19, 1929 ==
- The Soviet Union recognized Mohammed Nadir Shah as ruler of Afghanistan.
- The New York Stock Exchange posted more big losses amid a wave of selling.

== Sunday, October 20, 1929 ==
- In Berlin, two people were reported killed in street fighting that erupted when Der Stahlhelm clashed with police as they demonstrated in favor of the anti-Young Plan referendum and pushed towards the presidential mansion despite a police ban on street parades. Police also repelled a Stahlhelm attempt to storm a Jewish synagogue.
- Born: Colin Jeavons, Welsh television actor, in Newport, Monmouthshire

== Monday, October 21, 1929 ==
- The Edison Institute of Technology was dedicated in Dearborn, Michigan, on the fiftieth anniversary of Thomas Edison's invention of the lightbulb. "Every American owes a debt to him", President Hoover said in a speech honoring the 82-year-old inventor. "It is not alone a debt for great benefactions he has brought to mankind, but also a debt for the honor he has brought to our country. Mr. Edison, by his own genius and effort, rose from modest beginnings to membership among the leaders of men. His life gives renewed confidence that our institutions hold open the door of opportunity to all those who would enter."
- The giant Dornier Do X German seaplane had a successful 50-minute test flight over Lake Constance with 169 people aboard.
- The Dow dropped 3.71%. As panic began to set in, telephone and telegraph lines were swamped with calls and a record 3.1 million shares changed hands in the first two hours after trading opened. Many investors did not know where they stood through the day as the ticker results were delayed more than 60 minutes behind at one point.
- Born: Ursula K. Le Guin, American science fiction and fantasy author; in Berkeley, California (d. 2018)
- George Stinney, born in Pinewood, South Carolina, was an African-American teenager wrongfully convicted of raping and murdering two white girls Betty June Binnicker, age 11, and Mary Emma Thames, age 7. Exonerated in 2014. (d. 1944.)

== Tuesday, October 22, 1929 ==
- James Scullin formed a government with his Australian Labor Party to become the ninth Prime Minister of Australia.
- French prime minister Aristide Briand and his entire cabinet resigned after the government was defeated on a confidence vote over its Rhineland evacuation policy.
- "The present decline is a healthy reaction, which probably has overrun itself. There is nothing alarming about it", National City Bank chairman Charles E. Mitchell said about recent losses in the stock market. "In a market like this fundamentals are the things to look for, and if you can show me anything wrong with the situation generally, then I will be concerned."
- The New York Stock Exchange gained 1.75% on a day of optimism and relatively light trading. Nine out of ten market letters sent out by commission houses predicted a rally amid a general feeling that the situation had already bottomed out.

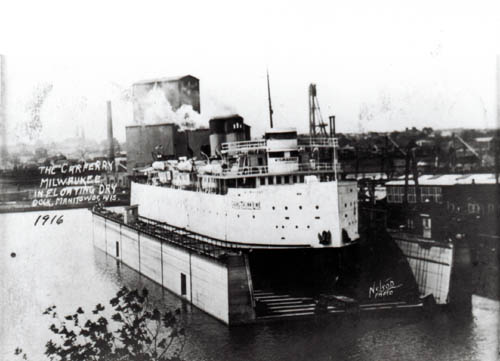
SS Milwaukee

- All 52 of the crew of the train ferry SS Milwaukee drowned when the ship sank in Lake Michigan, off of the Wisconsin coast, during a storm. The ship had no radio equipment and its captain proceeded into the storm despite the heavy seas.
- The Brazilian airline Panair do Brasil began operation as NYRBA do Brasil S.A.
- Born: Lev Yashin, footballer, in Moscow, USSR (d. 1990)

== Wednesday, October 23, 1929 ==
- The Dow Jones Industrial Average lost almost 21 points (6.33%) from its value of the previous day, which would cause many stockbrokers to make margin calls— demand for full payment from investors who had bought shares on credit, in effect obligating themselves to a loan from the brokerage— the next morning.
- A shot was fired at Crown Prince Umberto of Italy in Brussels as he laid a wreath at the Monument to the Unknown Soldier. The would-be assassin was immediately arrested and spirited away as the crowd tried to attack him.
- Habibullāh Kalakāni and 1,000 loyalists surrendered to the forces of Mohammed Nadir Shah after a week-long siege, on the condition that their lives be spared. Nadir Shah had Habibullah executed anyway, putting him to death on November 1.
- The laboratory of Consolidated Film Industries in Hollywood was destroyed by fire. 1 was killed and the loss was estimated to be as high as $50 million.

== Thursday, October 24, 1929 ==
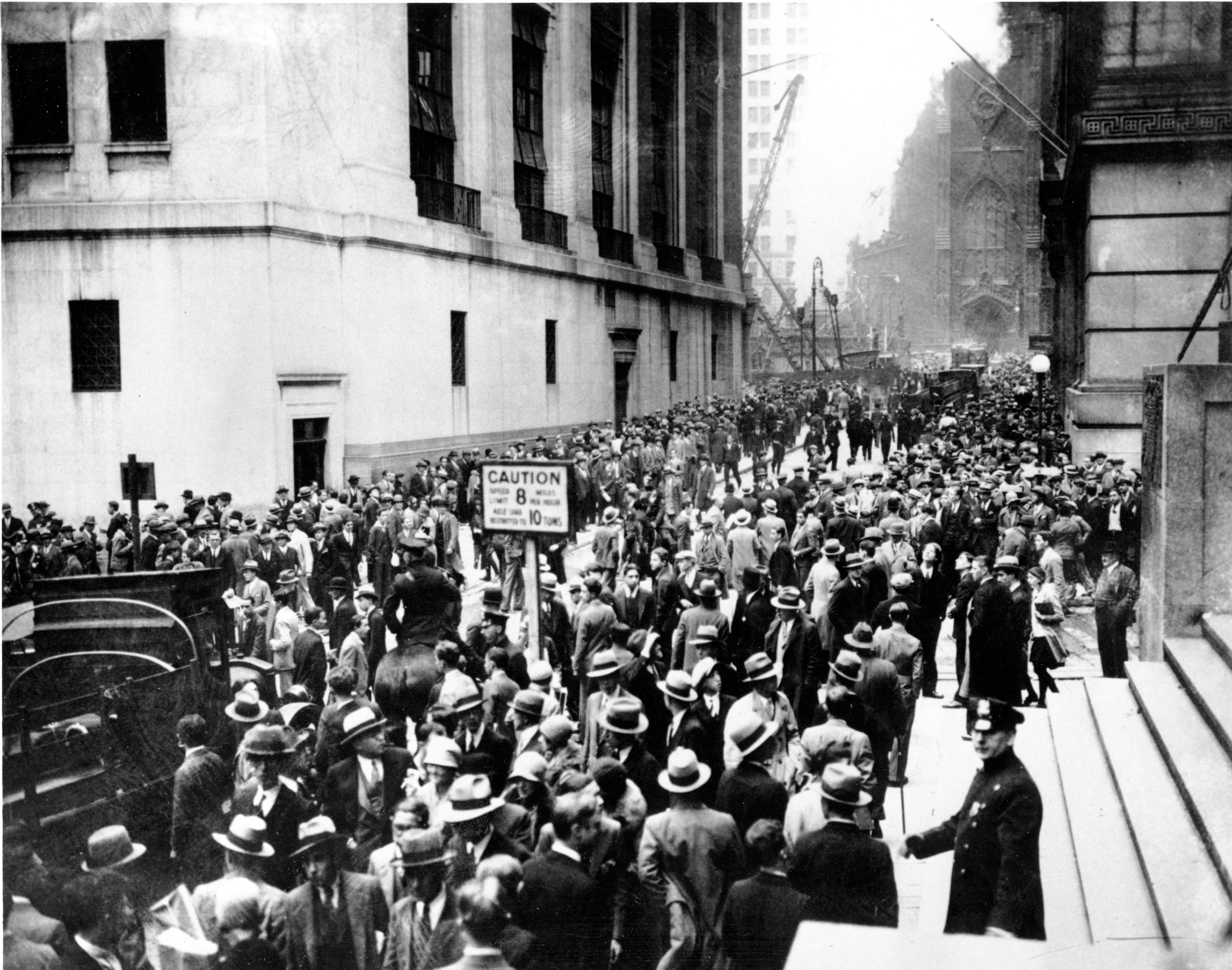
Crowds outside the New York Stock Exchange

- The Wall Street Crash of 1929 began on the day remembered later in history as "Black Thursday". The morning opened with a deluge of panic selling, causing prices to drop sharply. After a midday emergency meeting at J.P. Morgan & Co., prices recovered in the afternoon due in large part to a pool of investment bankers buying to prop up the market, a solution that worked in the short term and limited the market's fall for the day to only 2.09%. A new one-day record 12,880,900 shares were sold.
- Born: Clifford Rose, actor, in Hamnish Clifford, England (d. 2021)

== Friday, October 25, 1929 ==
- The day after Black Thursday, the Dow Jones Industrial Average rose 0.58%, giving investors hope that the worst was over.
- President Hoover made a formal statement indirectly addressing the stock market situation. "The fundamental business of the country, that is, the production and distribution of commodities, is on a sound and prosperous basis", Hoover said.
- Steel industrialist Charles M. Schwab told an audience that there was no reason why industrial prosperity should not continue indefinitely if the balance between production and consumption was maintained.
- Chewing gum magnate William Wrigley, Jr. said that from his viewpoint, general business was never so good and that prospects were "bright all over the world". Sears, Roebuck & Company President Robert E. Wood shared his optimism, saying, "We think the outlook remains the same as before the break. We are going to do the biggest month's business in our history this month."
- Business theorist Roger Babson, who predicted in early September that a stock market crash was coming, said that declines would continue but in a more orderly fashion. "Crazy markets such as we had yesterday must be followed by a resting up", Babson explained, adding, "Speculative buying for profit is over for a while. The buying from now on will be of a legitimate investment nature."
- In Krasnodar, Soviet authorities executed 21 men for anti-government activities.
- Ramsay MacDonald ended his visit to the United States and Canada, boarding a ship in Quebec headed back for Britain.

== Saturday, October 26, 1929 ==
- Stocks dipped slightly on a day of moderate trading. At the time, the New York Stock Exchange and other stock markets were open for trading for part of the day on Saturdays, a policy that would be discontinued in 1952.
- Édouard Daladier accepted French president Gaston Doumergue's offer to form the next government.
- Adolf Hitler and Alfred Hugenberg appeared together at the Zirkus Krone in Munich during a rally supporting the rejection of the Young Plan to restructure German reparations.
- It was announced that London buses would be red, as trials with yellow-and-red buses proved unpopular.
- Born:
  - Yvonne Marie Louise Odette Renée Ménard, French burlesque dancer (d. 2013)
  - Jim Weatherall, American football player, in Graham, Oklahoma (d. 1992)
- Died: Aby Warburg, 63, German art historian and cultural theorist

== Sunday, October 27, 1929 ==
- Parliamentary elections in Czechoslovakia were won by the Republican Party of Agricultural and Smallholder Peoples.
- In Rome, Benito Mussolini addressed 60,000 Blackshirts gathered to commemorate the seventh anniversary of the March on Rome. "Italy today is what I wanted it to be – an army of citizens and soldiers ready for works of peace, laborious, silent and disciplined", Mussolini declared. "And if tomorrow someone wished to disturb the peaceful rhythm of the development of our people, if someone wanted to break this superb unity of spirit, would you answer to my call, Blackshirts?" The legions roared in the affirmative.
- Three arrests were made during a demonstration of 500 British Communists outside the American embassy in London protesting the sentences of the textile workers in the Loray Mill Strike.

== Monday, October 28, 1929 ==
- The Dow Jones Industrial Average dropped another 12.82% as confidence plunged. This was the biggest single-day fall in the history of the up to this time and would remain so until Black Monday of 1987.
- Born: Virginia Held, philosopher, in Mendham, New Jersey
- Died: Bernhard von Bülow, 80, Chancellor of Germany from 1900 to 1909

== Tuesday, October 29, 1929 ==
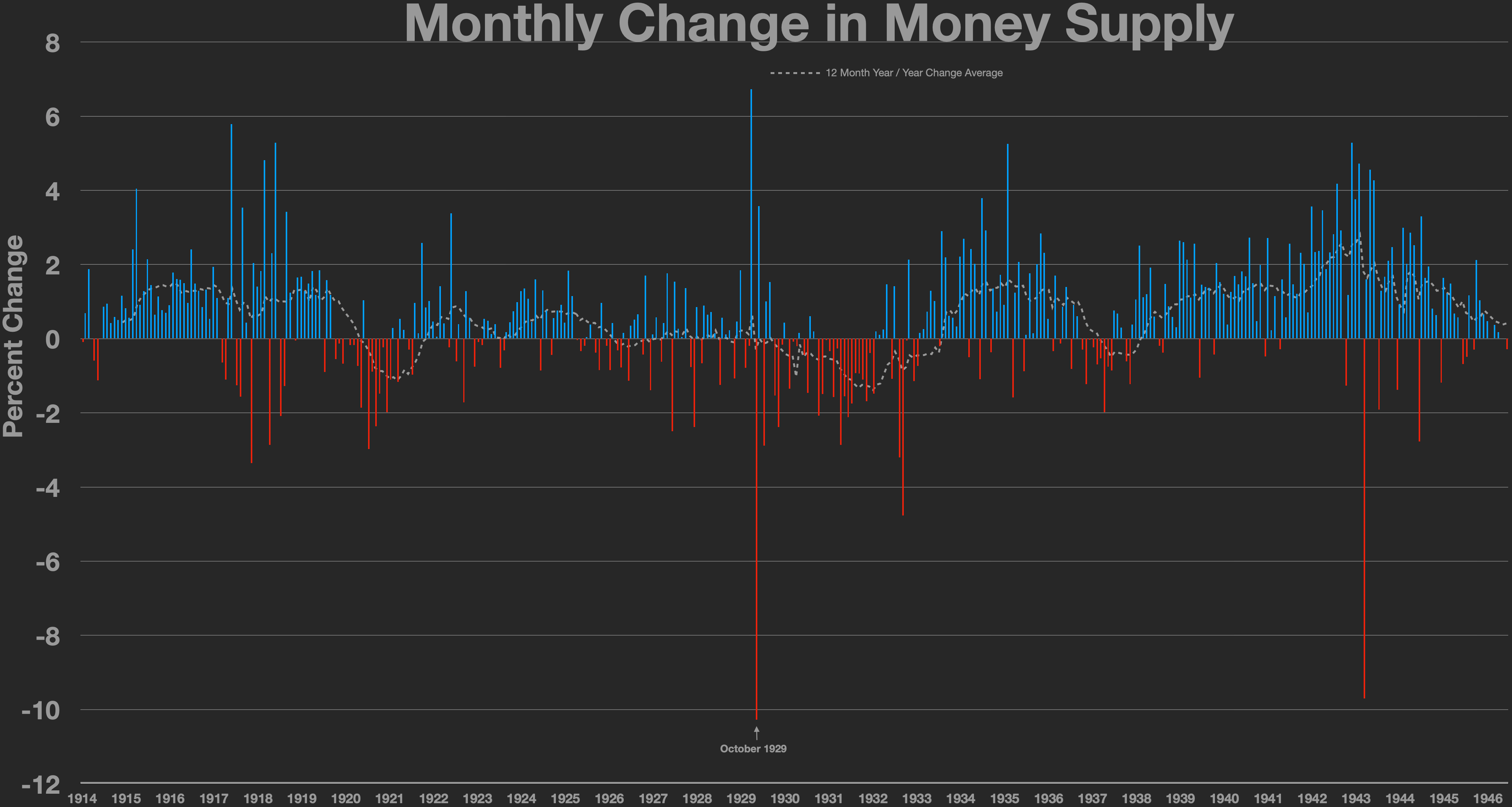
Total money supply contracted -10.28% in October 1929 and continued to contract for the next few years during Herbert Hoover's presidency

- The Dow Jones Industrial Average dropped a record 11.73%, four days after having been propped up five days earlier. With all hopes of a quick recovery now gone, sellers outnumbered buyers, 10 to one, as a record 16.4 million shares exchanged hands.
- Assistant Secretary of Commerce Julius Klein gave a national radio address reassuring the American people that there was no reason to change the president's statement of last Friday. "The number of citizens whose buying ability has been affected by the decline in the value of speculative securities is not very large", Klein said. "Their purchases do not make up a very significant fraction of the demand for goods. There is no reason why the twenty-five or more million families, representing over 95 percent of our population whose incomes remain undiminished should cut down their purchases of commodities, and therefore very few industries should see any appreciable reduction in the sales of their output."
- Industrialist John J. Raskob announced he was reentering the stock market for the first time in months. "Prudent investors are now buying stocks in huge quantities and will profit handsomely when this hysteria is over and our people have opportunity in calmer moments to appreciate the great stability of business by reason of the sound fundamental economic conditions existing in this great country", Raskob said.
- The steamboat SS Wisconsin foundered during an early morning storm off the coast of Kenosha, Wisconsin. 60 were rescued but 12 crew were lost.
- The enrollment period for the German referendum expired.
- Died:
  - Emily Robin, 55, English Madame who operated the infamous Gamine brothel in Kingston upon Hull
  - John Roach Straton, 54, American Baptist minister and temperance activist

== Wednesday, October 30, 1929 ==
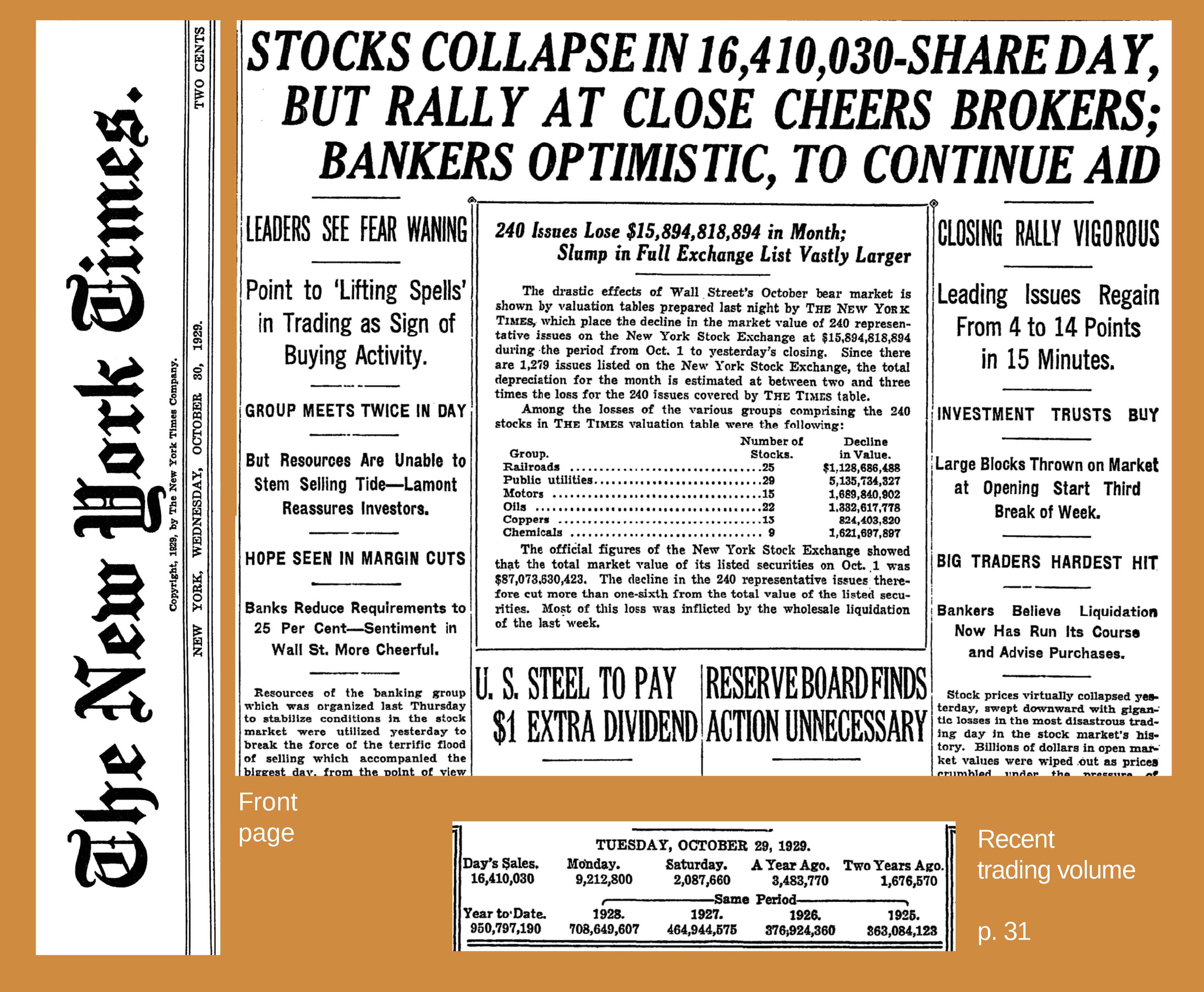
After large market declines on October 28 and 29, The New York Times described the financial community's response to "the most disastrous trading day in the stock market's history". Margin requirements were reduced to 25%, banking leaders expressed assurance of their support, and the sentiment on Wall Street was said to be "more cheerful" after earlier declines.

- The Dow Jones Industrial Average rebounded with a gain of 12.34%, as traders bought shares at lower cost as part of looking for bargains. The volume of trading eased to 10.7 million shares as many investors decided to hold on to their stocks and wait for the market to recover.
- A general election was held in the Canadian province of Ontario. The Conservative Party led by Howard Ferguson was re-elected with an increased majority. Government-controlled liquor sales were legal in Ontario and the Conservatives were the only significant "wet" party, so the matter of prohibition in the province was considered definitively settled.
- Étienne Clémentel accepted the task of trying to form the next French government after Édouard Daladier was unsuccessful.
- John D. Rockefeller released a rare public statement from his home. "Believing that fundamental conditions of the country are sound and that there is nothing in the business situation to warrant the destruction of values that has taken place on the exchanges in the last week, my son and I have for some days been purchasing sound common stocks. We are continuing and will continue our purchases in substantial amounts at levels which we believe represent sound investment values", the statement read.

== Thursday, October 31, 1929 ==
- The Dow Jones recovered another 5.82% on a half-day of trading.
- Nova Scotia voters went in favor of repealing prohibition in a province-wide referendum, leaving Prince Edward Island as the only "dry" region left in all of Canada.
- Lord Irwin, the Viceroy of India, announced that a round table conference would be held to determine the country's future. The declaration included an almost offhand remark that the "natural issue of India's constitutional progress" was "the attainment of Dominion Status", but the statement became very controversial in Britain.
- Born:
  - Robert Utley, American author and historian, in Bauxite, Arkansas (d. 2022)
  - Bud Spencer (stage name for Carlo Pedersoli), Italian actor, in Naples, Italy (d. 2016)
