= Trading halt =

Pause in trading on a stock exchange

A trading halt occurs in the U.S. when a stock exchange stops trading on a specific security for a certain time period. The halt, which can happen a few times a day per security if FINRA deems it, usually lasts for one hour, but is not limited to that. Trading halts can happen any time of day. The listed company is supposed to call the exchange where it is listed, 10 minutes prior to any material news that they are releasing, in order for the exchange to halt the stock before the news is released. The first 5 minutes of a halt is for "news pending" before any information is released that could affect a stock significantly, also known as the "5 minute window".

Trading halts usually occur when a publicly traded company is going to release significant news about itself. The halt in trading for the affected security gives investors time to review the news and assess its impact. Another situation in which a trading halt might occur is when the exchange is uncertain "whether the security continues to meet the market’s listing standards."

Note, there are also "trading pauses", which are defined as, under NASDAQ, "if a security is subject to a Trading Pause, the Pause Threshold Price field will contain the reference threshold price that deviates 10% from a print on the Consolidated Tape that is last sale eligible as compared to every print in that security on a rolling five (5) minute basis".

== Regulatory and non-regulatory trading halts ==
Both of the reasons mentioned above are "regulatory" trading halts and are implemented on many major stock exchanges (for example, the NYSE American, NASDAQ, and New York Stock Exchange). When a United States exchange enacts a regulatory halt for a security, other U.S. exchanges that also trade the security will honor the halt.

The NASDAQ and other exchanges currently use 11 codes to specify in more detail why trading has been halted for a security. The Over The Counter Bulletin Board (OTCBB) currently uses 5 codes.

A "non-regulatory" trading halt occurs if "significant order imbalance between buyers and sellers in a security" exist. (The NASDAQ stock exchange does not implement non-regulatory trading halts.) Before trading resumes, market specialists must determine an appropriate price range in which the security can trade. Unlike regulatory halts, other U.S. exchanges do not always stop trading a security affected by a non-regulatory halt.

NASDAQ OMX (owner of the NASDAQ stock market) displays current trading halts for the NASDAQ, New York Stock Exchange, and the American Stock Exchange, along with a rolling 21-day history. The OTCBB maintains its own trading halt list and a rolling 6-month history.

== Trading suspension ==
A trading suspension occurs when the United States Securities and Exchange Commission (SEC) stops trading for a specific security because of "serious questions ... about a company’s assets, operations, or other financial information." Note that in this case, it is the SEC — not the exchange — stopping the security from being traded. On its web site, the SEC maintains a list of trading suspensions going back to 1995.

== Trading curb ==
Trading curbs stop trading for an entire exchange when the market has experienced a drop (or several drops) in value.

== See also ==
- Stock market crash
