= Panic selling =

Sudden, irrational selling of an investment causing its price to drop

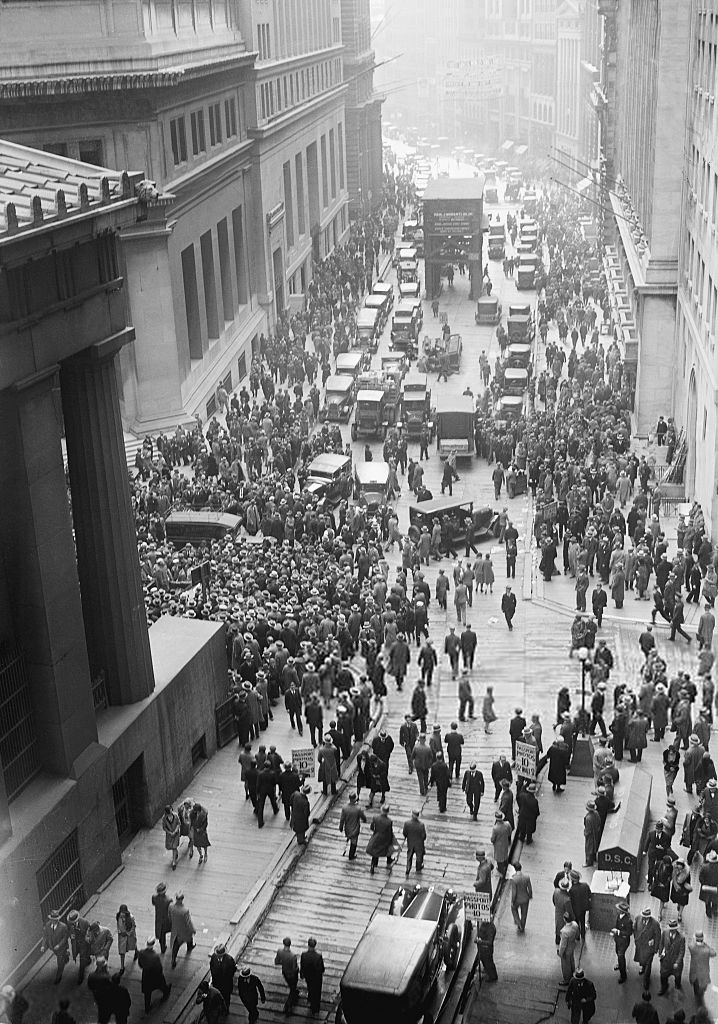
Crowd gathering on Wall Street after the 1929 Crash

Panic selling is a large-scale selling of an investment that causes a sharp decline in prices. Specifically, an investor wants to sell an investment with little regard to the price obtained. The sale is problematic because the investor is reacting to emotion and fear, rather than evaluating the fundamentals.

Today, most major stock exchanges use trading curbs to throttle panic selling, provide a cooling period for people to digest information, and restore some degree of normality to the market.

== Causes ==
The panic is typically the "fear that the market for a particular industry, or in general, will decline, causing additional losses". Panic selling causes the market to be flooded with securities, properties or commodities that are being sold at lower prices, which further stumbles prices and induces even more selling. Here are common causes for the panic:

- High speculation in market (e.g. Dubai housing crash in 2009)
- Economic instability (e.g. 2008 financial crisis)
- Political issues

== Examples ==
=== Stock market crash of 1929 ===
After World War I, the United States experienced significant economic growth that was fueled by new technologies and improved production processes. Industrial production output increased 25% between the years 1927 and 1929. In late October 1929, the decline began in the market and led to panic selling as more investors were unwilling to risk additional losses. The market sharply declined and was followed by the Great Depression.

=== 2008 financial crisis ===
The mortgage crisis led to public concern over the ability of financial institutions to cover their exposures in the subprime loan market and credit default swaps. As more financial institutions such as Lehman Brothers and AIG reported their failures, the market instability deepened and more investors withdrew their investments. In October, the stock market crash occurred. Dow Jones Industrial Average fell 1,874 points or 18.1% during Black Week which began on October 6. In that same month, S&P 500 and the Nasdaq Composite reached their lowest level since 2003.

=== Dubai housing crash of 2009 ===
Dubai had a significant financial crisis in which its debt accumulated to $80 billion. The state-owned holding company, Dubai World, had liabilities of $60 billion. Its real estate subsidy was at risk to default on repayment of bonds, yet the Dubai government was unsuccessful to make a rescue package for the company. The debt problem of Dubai World triggered mass speculation in the property market. In the first quarter of 2009, house prices in Dubai fell 41%.

=== Gold price plunge ===
Many people invest in gold primarily as a hedge against inflation in periods of economic uncertainty. During the second quarter of 2011, the gold price hiked 22.69% and reached its highest price, at $1907. On September 23, 2011, the gold price plunged $101.90, or 5.9%, in regular trading, which was the first $100 daily price drop since January 22, 1980. The gold price had reached its top, but the global economy was declining. Investors had a growing concern in the global economic decline, and fear were raised of potential price fall. Panic selling occurred in the gold market and caused the price to plunge.

== See also ==
- Panic buying
- Stock market crash
- Economic bubble
- Mass hysteria
