= Wall Street crash of 1929 =

Major stock market crash in the United States

Wall Street Crash of 1929
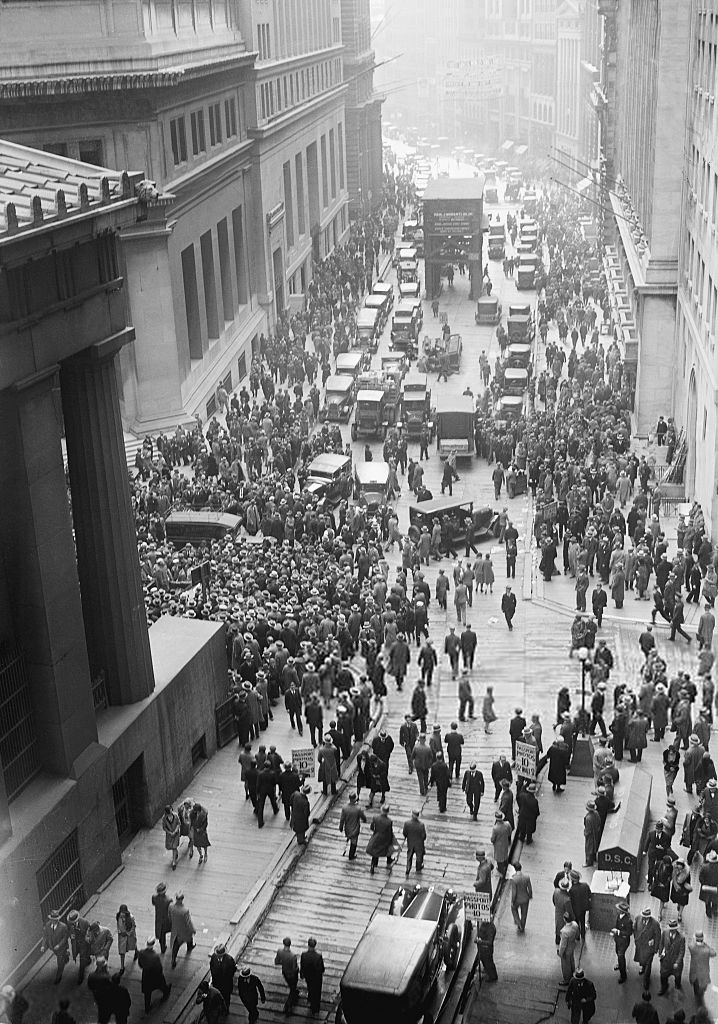
- Crowd gathering on Wall Street after the 1929 crash
- Date: October 24–29, 1929
- Time: (EST)
- Duration: 6 days
- Venue: New York Stock Exchange
- Location: New York City, United States; 40°42′23″N 74°00′41″W
- Also known as: The Great Crash, Black Thursday, Black Friday, Black Monday, Black Tuesday
- Type: Stock market crash / Financial crisis
- Theme: Economic collapse
- Cause: Speculative bubble, margin buying, agricultural overproduction, Fed tightening
- Participants: Investors, brokers, banks, the American public
- Outcome: The Great Depression and later the passage of the New Deal
- Property damage: Massive financial loss (approx. $30 billion wiped out)
- Displaced: Millions of unemployed and bankrupt individuals
- Inquiries: Pecora Investigation (1932)

The Wall Street crash of 1929, also known as the Great Crash, was a major stock market crash in the United States which began in October 1929 with a sharp decline in prices on the New York Stock Exchange (NYSE). It triggered a rapid erosion of confidence in the U.S. banking system and marked what would later cascade into the worldwide Great Depression that lasted until the United States entered into World War II on December 8, 1941, making it the most devastating crash in the country's history. It is most associated with October 24, 1929, known as "Black Thursday", when a record 12.9 million shares were traded on the exchange, and October 29, 1929, or "Black Tuesday", when some 16.4 million shares were traded.

The "Roaring Twenties" of the previous decade had been a time of industrial expansion in the U.S., and much of the profit had been invested in speculation, including in stocks. Many members of the public, disappointed by the low interest rates offered on their bank deposits, committed their relatively small sums to stockbrokers. By the year 1929, the U.S. economy was showing signs of trouble; the agricultural sector was depressed due to overproduction and falling prices, forcing many farmers into debt, and consumer goods manufacturers also had unsellable output due to low wages and thus low purchasing power. Factory owners cut production and fired staff, reducing demand even further. Despite these trends, investors continued buying shares in parts of the economy where output was falling and unemployment was rising, pushing stock prices far above their underlying value.

By September 1929, more experienced shareholders realized that prices could not continue to rise and began to get rid of their holdings, which caused share values to stall and then fall, encouraging more to sell. As investors panicked, the selling became frenzied. After Black Thursday, leading bankers joined forces to purchase stock at prices above market value, a strategy used during the Panic of 1907. This encouraged a brief recovery before Black Tuesday. Further action failed to halt the fall, which continued until July 8, 1932; by then, the stock market had lost some 90% of its pre-crash value.

Congress responded to the events by passing the Banking Act of 1933 (Glass–Steagall Act), which separated commercial and investment banking, and the Securities Act of 1933 and Securities Exchange Act of 1934, which created the U.S. Securities and Exchange Commission, authorized the creation of its disclosure regulations, and prohibited the market manipulation, insider trading, and speculative investing practices that precipitated the crash. Stock exchanges introduced a practice of suspending trading when prices fell rapidly to limit panic selling. Scholars disagree about the crash’s role in the Great Depression. Some argue that the price swings were not, by themselves, severe enough to trigger a major collapse of the financial system. Others contend that the crash, combined with other economic problems in the U.S. in the 1920s, should be understood as one stage of a broader business cycle affecting capitalist economies.

== Background ==
The Dow Jones Industrial Average, 1928–1930

The "Roaring Twenties", the decade following World War I and the Recession of 1920–1921, has been scholarly and biographically regarded as an era defined by wealth, luxury and excess. Building on post-war optimism, rural Americans migrated to the cities in vast numbers throughout the decade, hoping to find a more prosperous life amid the ever-growing expansion of America's industrial sector, pursuing means of conspicuous consumption.

Declines in the money supply caused by Federal Reserve decisions were beginning to have a severely contractionary effect on output. Despite the inherent risk of speculation, it was widely believed that the stock market would continue to rise. On March 25, 1929, after the Federal Reserve warned of excessive speculation, a small crash occurred as investors began selling stocks rapidly, exposing the market's shaky foundation. Two days later, banker Charles E. Mitchell announced that his company, the National City Bank, would provide $25 million in credit to stop the market's slide. Mitchell's move brought a temporary halt to the financial crisis, and call money declined from 20 to 8 percent. However, the American economy showed ominous signs of trouble. Steel production declined, construction was sluggish, automobile sales went down, and consumers were building up large debts because of easy credit.

Despite these problems and the market breaks in March and May 1929, stocks resumed their advance in June, and the gains continued almost unabated until early September 1929 (the Dow Jones average gained more than 20% between June and September). The market had been on a nine-year run that saw the Dow Jones Industrial Average increase in value tenfold, peaking at 381.17 on September 3, 1929. Shortly before the crash, economist Irving Fisher famously proclaimed "Stock prices have reached what looks like a permanently high plateau". The optimism and the financial gains of the great bull market have been regarded as having been shaken after a well-publicized September 5 prediction from financial expert Roger Babson, declaring that "a crash is coming, and it may be terrific". The initial September decline was thus called the "Babson Break" in the press. That was the start of the Great Crash, but until the severe phase of the crash in October, many investors regarded the September "Babson Break" as a "healthy correction" and buying opportunity.

On September 20, 1929, top British investor Clarence Hatry and many of his associates were jailed for fraud and forgery, leading to the suspension of his companies. This may have weakened the confidence of Americans in their own companies, although it had minimal impact on the London Stock Exchange. In the days leading up to the crash, the market was severely unstable. Periods of selling and high volumes were interspersed with brief periods of rising prices and recovery.

Conservative economists Jude Wanniski and Alan Reynolds have argued that the immediate cause of the crash was investor fears about the Smoot–Hawley Tariff Act, which was being negotiated in the U.S. Senate at the time. On October 23, 1929, while voting on an amendment to the bill, 16 senators who had been considered members of an anti-tariff coalition unexpectedly changed their votes and supported an increase in the tariff on calcium carbide imports from Canada. The crash began that afternoon and grew worse the following morning. In response, libertarian economist Scott Sumner has pointed out that this vote did not significantly change the anti-tariff coalition, which Sumner says was growing stronger during the days following October 23 while the crash was occurring. Instead, Sumner argues that the ongoing conflict between pro-tariff and anti-tariff Republicans led investors to worry that the party could not govern effectively on economic issues. In particular, he cites the controversy over the appointment of Otto H. Kahn, a Wall Street banker who supported the tariff bill, as treasurer of the Republican Senatorial Campaign Committee. Kahn's appointment was announced on the evening of October 24, and fierce opposition from Progressive Republicans who opposed the bill forced him to publicly turn down the offer on October 29.

Harold Bierman, Jr., argues that the decline in stock prices began on October 3, 1929, in response to a widely publicized comment from British Chancellor of the Exchequer Philip Snowden, who described American markets as a "speculative orgy". In this unsettled market, Bierman says, the sudden crash a few weeks later was triggered by federal and state efforts to regulate public utilities, which had become a common vehicle for investment trusts. In particular, he argues that the creation of the Committee on Public Service Securities in the state of New York by Governor Franklin D. Roosevelt on October 8, and similar investigatory action in Massachusetts the following week, were possible "straws that broke the camel's back", sparking fears that those public utilities were overvalued by speculators.

== Stock crash ==
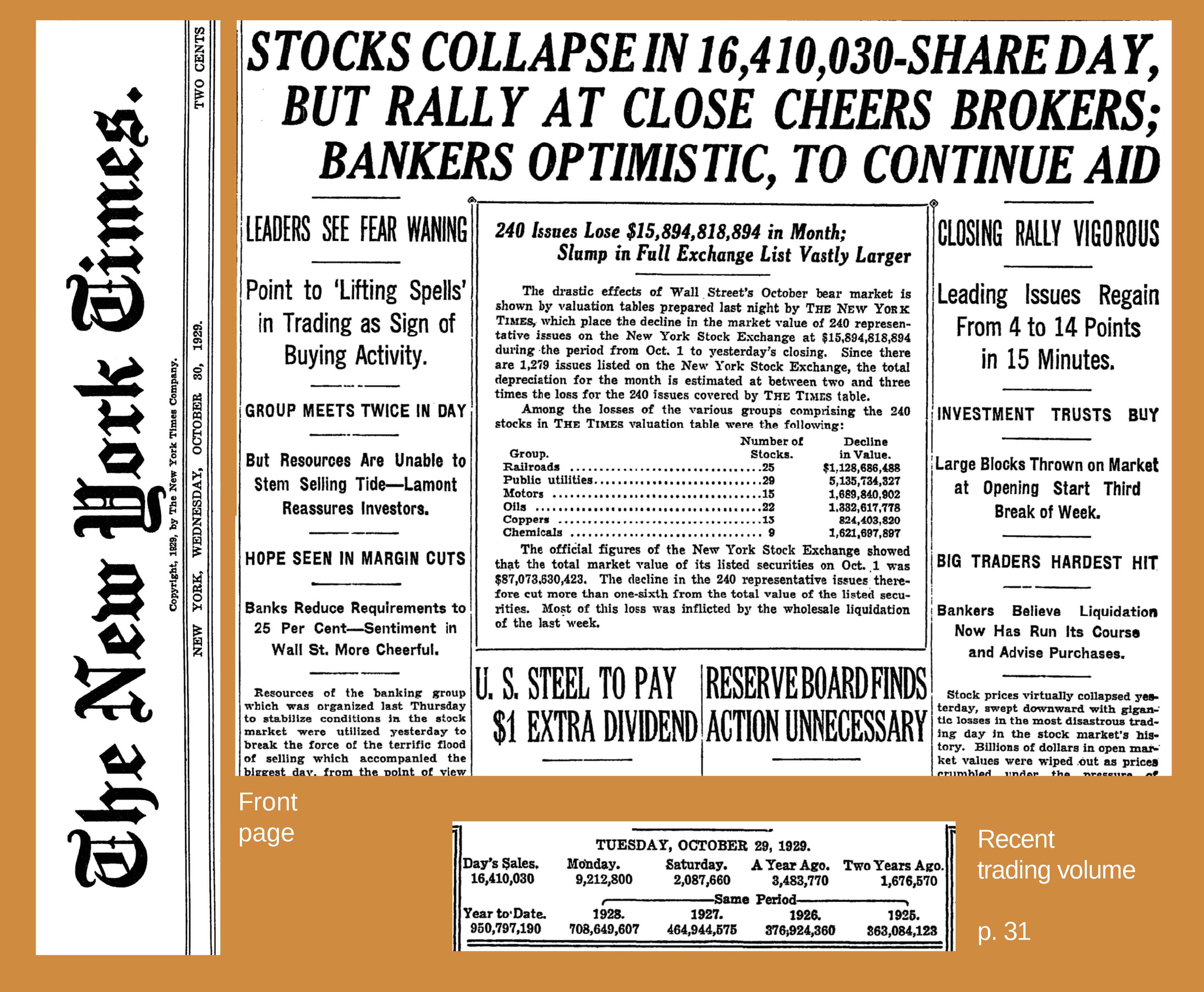
After large market declines on October 28 and 29, The New York Times described the financial community's response to "the most disastrous trading day in the stock market's history". Margin requirements were reduced to 25%, banking leaders expressed assurance of their support, and the sentiment on Wall Street was said to be "more cheerful" after earlier declines.

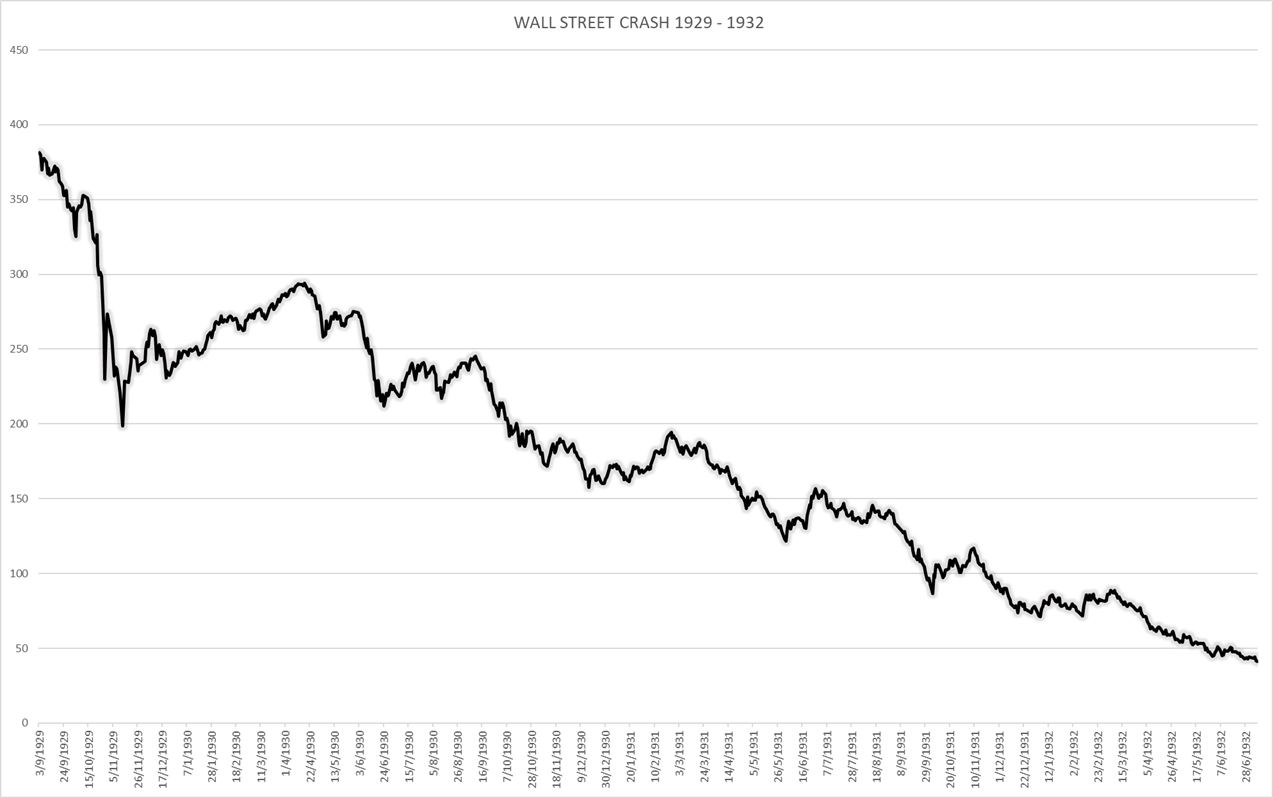
Dow Jones Industrial Average from just before the crash in 1929 to 1932 when the index bottomed out

Selling intensified in late-October. A sharp, unexpected decline in stock prices began on the afternoon of October 23, about an hour before trading ended for the day, leading to a 4.6% drop in total market value. That night, many investors panicked and resolved to sell their shares as soon as possible. On October 24, "Black Thursday", the market lost 11% of its value at the opening bell. In the first three minutes alone, nearly three million shares of stock, accounting for $2 billion of wealth, changed hands. The huge volume meant that the report of prices on the ticker tape in brokerage offices around the nation was hours late, and so investors had no idea what most stocks were trading for. Several leading Wall Street bankers met to find a solution to the panic and chaos on the trading floor. The meeting included Thomas W. Lamont, acting head of Morgan Bank; Albert Wiggin, head of the Chase National Bank; and Charles E. Mitchell, president of the National City Bank of New York. They chose Richard Whitney, vice president of the Exchange, to act on their behalf.

With the bankers' financial resources behind him, Whitney placed a bid to purchase 25,000 shares of U.S. Steel at $205 per share, a price well above the current market. As traders watched, Whitney then placed similar bids on other "blue chip" stocks. The tactic was similar to one that had ended the Panic of 1907 and succeeded in halting the slide. The Dow Jones Industrial Average recovered, closing down only 6.38 points (2.09%) for the day.

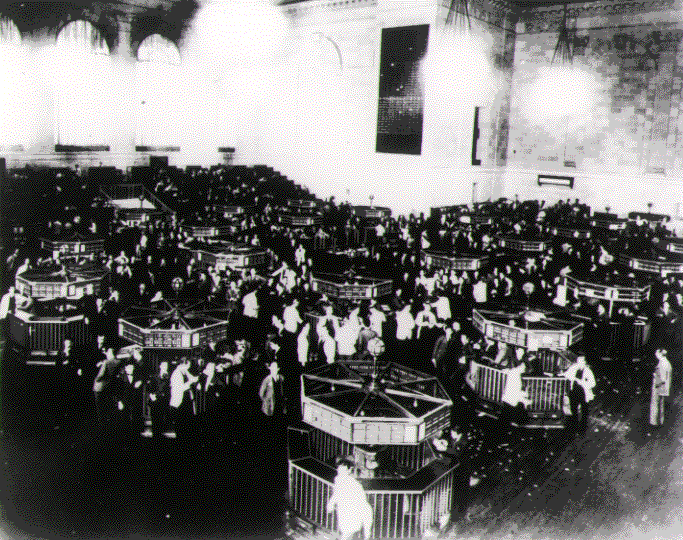
The trading floor of the American Stock Exchange Building in 1930, six months after the Crash of 1929

On October 28, "Black Monday", more investors facing margin calls decided to get out of the market, and the slide continued with a record loss in the Dow for the day of 38.33 points, or 12.82%.

On October 29, 1929, "Black Tuesday" hit Wall Street as investors traded some 16 million shares on the New York Stock Exchange in a single day. Around $14 billion of stock value was lost, wiping out thousands of investors. The panic selling reached its peak with some stocks having no buyers at any price. The Dow lost an additional 30.57 points, or 11.73%, for a total drop of 68.90 points, or 23.05% in two days.

On October 29, William C. Durant joined with members of the Rockefeller family and other financial giants to buy large quantities of stocks to demonstrate to the public their confidence in the market, but their efforts failed to stop the large decline in prices. The massive volume of stocks traded that day made the ticker continue to run until about 7:45 p.m.

Dow Jones Industrial Average on Black Monday and Black Tuesday
| Date | Change | % Change | Close |
|---|---|---|---|
| October 28, 1929 | −38.33 | −12.82 | 260.64 |
| October 29, 1929 | −30.57 | −11.73 | 230.07 |

After a one-day recovery on October 30, when the Dow regained 28.40 points, or 12.34%, to close at 258.47, the market continued to fall, arriving at an interim bottom on November 13, 1929, with the Dow closing at 198.60. The market then recovered for several months, starting on November 14, with the Dow gaining 18.59 points to close at 217.28, and reaching a secondary closing peak (bear market rally) of 294.07 on April 17, 1930. The Dow then embarked on another, much longer, steady slide from April 1930 to July 8, 1932, when it closed at 41.22, its lowest level of the 20th century, concluding an 89.2% loss for the index in less than three years.

Beginning on March 15, 1933, and continuing through the rest of the 1930s, the Dow began to slowly regain the ground it had lost. The largest percentage increases of the Dow Jones occurred during the early and mid-1930s. In late 1937, there was a sharp dip in the stock market, but prices held well above the 1932 lows. The Dow Jones did not return to its peak close of September 3, 1929, for 25 years, until November 23, 1954.

== Aftermath ==
In 1932, the Pecora Commission was established by the U.S. Senate to study the causes of the crash. The following year, the U.S. Congress passed the Glass–Steagall Act mandating a separation between commercial banks, which take deposits and extend loans, and investment banks, which underwrite, issue, and distribute stocks, bonds, and other securities.

Afterwards, stock markets around the world instituted measures to suspend trading in the event of rapid declines, claiming that the measures would prevent such panic sales. However, the one-day crash of Black Monday, October 19, 1987, when the Dow Jones Industrial Average fell 22.6%, as well as Black Monday of March 16, 2020 (−12.9%), were worse in percentage terms than any single day of the 1929 crash (although the combined 25% decline of October 28–29, 1929, was larger than that of October 19, 1987, and remains the worst two-day decline as of October 7, 2024).

== Analysis ==
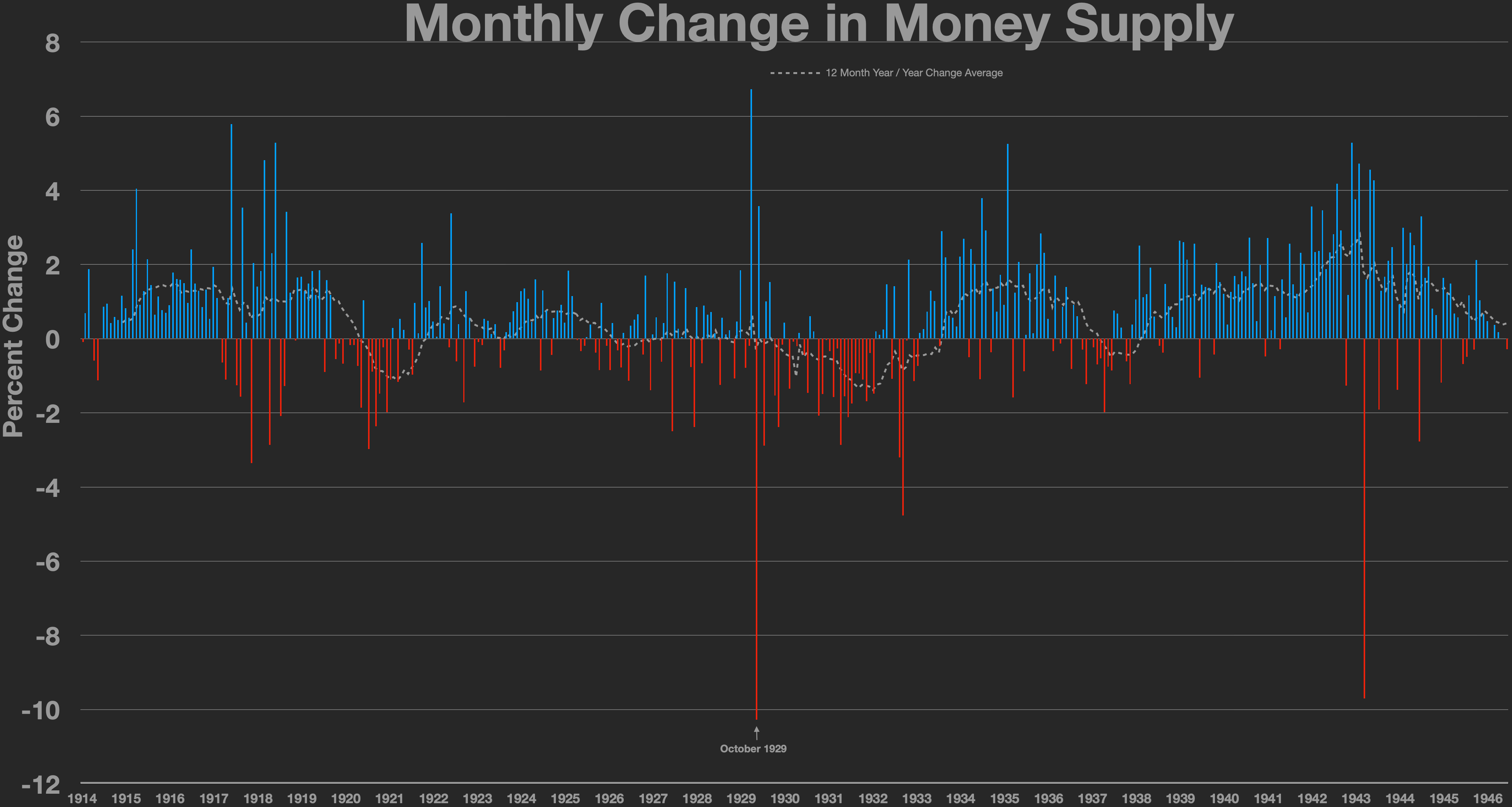
Total money supply contracted −10.28% in October 1929 after increasing 6.73% the month prior. Monetary policy became very volatile after the New York Fed President Benjamin Strong's death in October 1928.

The crash followed a speculative boom that had taken hold in the late 1920s. During the latter half of the 1920s, steel production, building construction, retail turnover, automobiles registered, and even railway receipts advanced from record to record. The combined net profits of 536 manufacturing and trading companies showed an increase, in the first six months of 1929, of 36.6% over 1928, itself a record half-year. Iron and steel led the way with doubled gains. Such figures set up a crescendo of stock-exchange speculation that led hundreds of thousands of Americans to invest heavily in the stock market. Many people were borrowing money to buy more stocks. By August 1929, brokers were routinely lending small investors more than two-thirds of the face value of the stocks that they were buying. Over $8.5 billion was out on loan, more than the entire amount of currency circulating in the United States at the time.

The rising share prices encouraged more people to invest on the hope that share prices would rise further. Speculation thus fueled further rises and created an economic bubble. Because of margin buying, investors stood to lose large sums of money if the market turned down or even if it failed to advance quickly enough. The average price to earnings ratio of S&P Composite stocks was 32.6 in September 1929, clearly above historical norms. According to the economist John Kenneth Galbraith, the exuberance also resulted in a large number of people placing their savings and money in leverage investment products like Goldman Sachs's "Blue Ridge trust" and "Shenandoah Trust", which crashed in 1929 as well, resulting in losses to banks of $475 billion in 2010 dollars ($701.3 billion in 2025).

Good harvests had built up a mass of 250 million bushels of wheat to be "carried over" when 1929 opened. By May there was also a winter wheat crop of 560 million bushels ready for harvest in the Mississippi Valley. The oversupply caused such a drop in wheat prices that the net incomes of farmers from wheat were threatened with extinction. Stock markets are always sensitive to the future state of commodity markets, and the slump arrived on time. In June 1929, the position was saved by a severe drought in the Dakotas and the Canadian West, as well as unfavorable seed times in Argentina and eastern Australia. The oversupply was now wanted to fill the gaps in the 1929 world wheat production. From 97¢ per bushel in May, the price of wheat rose to $1.49 in July. When it was seen that figure would make American farmers get more for their crop that year than in 1928, stocks went up again.

In August, the wheat price fell when France and Italy were bragging about a magnificent harvest, and the situation in Australia improved. That sent a shiver through Wall Street and stock prices quickly dropped, but word of cheap stocks brought a fresh rush of "stags" (amateur speculators) and investors. Congress voted for a $100 million relief package for the farmers on the hope of stabilizing wheat prices, but by October, the price had fallen to $1.31 per bushel.

Other important economic barometers were also slowing or even falling by mid-1929, including car sales, house sales, and steel production. The falling commodity and industrial production may have dented even American self-confidence, and the stock market peaked on September 3 at 381.17 just after Labor Day, and it started to falter after Roger Babson issued his prescient "market crash" forecast. By the end of September, the market had dropped 10% from the peak (the "Babson Break"). Selling intensified in early and mid-October, with sharp down days punctuated by a few up days. Panic selling of massive proportion started the week of October 21 and intensified and culminated on October 24, October 28, and especially October 29 ("Black Tuesday").

The president of the Chase National Bank, Albert H. Wiggin, said at the time:

We are reaping the natural fruit of the orgy of speculation in which millions of people have indulged. It was inevitable, because of the tremendous increase in the number of stockholders in recent years, that the number of sellers would be greater than ever when the boom ended and selling took the place of buying.

== Effects ==
=== United States ===
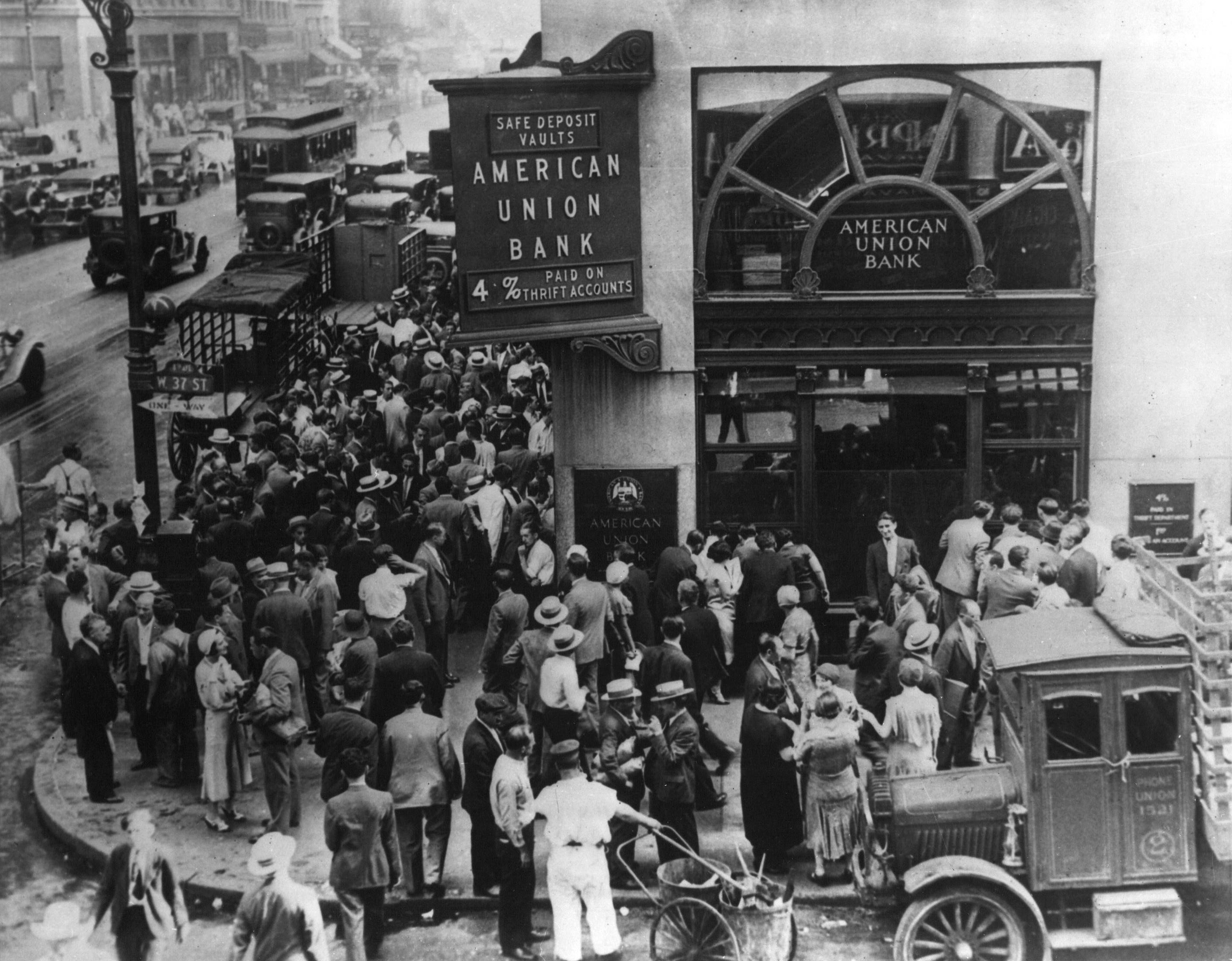
Crowd at New York's American Union Bank during a bank run early in the Great Depression

Together, the 1929 stock market crash and the Great Depression formed the largest financial crisis of the 20th century. The panic of October 1929 has come to serve as a symbol of the economic contraction that gripped the world during the next decade. The falls in share prices on October 24 and 29, 1929 were practically instantaneous in all financial markets, except Japan.

The Wall Street Crash had a major impact on the U.S. and world economy, and it has been the source of intense academic historical, economic, and political debate from its aftermath until the present day. Some people believed that abuses by utility holding companies contributed to the Wall Street Crash of 1929 and the Great Depression that followed. Many people blamed the crash on commercial banks that were too eager to put deposits at risk on the stock market.

In 1930, 1,352 banks held more than $853 million in deposits; in 1931, 2,294 banks failed with nearly $1.7 billion in deposits. Many businesses failed (28,285 failures and a daily rate of 133 in 1931).

The 1929 crash brought the Roaring Twenties to a halt. As tentatively expressed by economic historian Charles P. Kindleberger, in 1929, there was no lender of last resort effectively present, which, if it had existed and been properly exercised, would have been key in shortening the business slowdown that normally follows financial crises. The crash instigated widespread and long-lasting consequences for the United States. Historians still debate whether the 1929 crash sparked the Great Depression or if it merely coincided with bursting a loose credit-inspired economic bubble. Only 16% of American households were invested in the stock market within the United States during the period leading up to this depression, suggesting that the crash carried somewhat less weight in causing it.

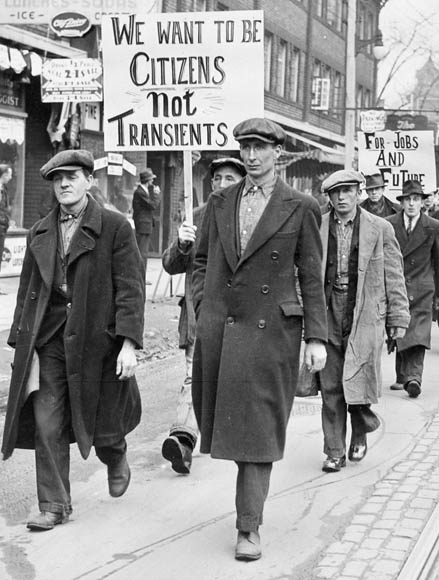
Unemployed men march in Toronto.

However, the psychological effects of the crash reverberated across the nation as businesses became aware of the difficulties in securing capital market investments for new projects and expansions. Business uncertainty naturally affects job security for employees, and as the American worker (the consumer) faced uncertainty with regard to income, naturally the propensity to consume declined. The decline in stock prices caused bankruptcies and severe macroeconomic difficulties, including contraction of credit, business closures, firing of workers, bank failures, decline of the money supply, and other economically depressing events.

The resultant rise of mass unemployment is seen as a result of the crash, although the crash is by no means the sole event that contributed to the depression. The Wall Street Crash is usually seen as having the greatest impact on the events that followed and therefore is widely regarded as signaling the downward economic slide that initiated the Great Depression. True or not, the consequences were dire for almost everybody. Most academic experts agree on one aspect of the crash: It wiped out billions of dollars of wealth in one day, and this immediately depressed consumer buying.

The failure set off a worldwide run on US gold deposits (i.e., the dollar) and forced the Federal Reserve to raise interest rates into the slump. Some 4,000 banks and other lenders ultimately failed. Also, the uptick rule, which allowed short selling only when the last tick in a stock's price was positive, was implemented after the 1929 market crash to prevent short sellers from driving the price of a stock down in a bear raid.

=== Europe ===
The stock market crash of October 1929 led directly to the Great Depression in Europe. When stocks plummeted on the New York Stock Exchange, the world noticed immediately. Although financial leaders in the United Kingdom, as in the United States, vastly underestimated the extent of the crisis that ensued, it soon became clear that the world's economies were more interconnected than ever. The effects of the disruption to the global system of financing, trade, and production and the subsequent meltdown of the American economy were soon felt throughout Europe.

In 1930 and 1931, in particular, unemployed workers went on strike, demonstrated in public, and otherwise took direct action to call public attention to their plight. Within the UK, protests often focused on the so-called means test, which the government had instituted in 1931 to limit the amount of unemployment payments made to individuals and families. For working people, the means test seemed an intrusive and insensitive way to deal with the chronic and relentless deprivation caused by the economic crisis. The strikes were met forcefully, with police breaking up protests, arresting demonstrators, and charging them with crimes related to the violation of public order.

== Academic debate ==
There is a debate among economists and historians as to what role the crash played in subsequent economic, social, and political events. The Economist argued in a 1998 article that the Depression did not start with the stock market crash, nor was it clear at the time of the crash that a depression was starting. They asked, "Can a very serious Stock Exchange collapse produce a serious setback to industry when industrial production is for the most part in a healthy and balanced condition?" They argued that there must be some setback, but there was not yet sufficient evidence to prove that it would be long or would necessarily produce a general industrial depression.

However, The Economist cautioned that some bank failures were also to be expected and some banks may not have had any reserves left for financing commercial and industrial enterprises. It concluded that the position of the banks was the key to the situation, but what was going to happen could not have been foreseen.

Milton Friedman and Anna Schwartz's A Monetary History of the United States argues that what made the "great contraction" so severe was not the downturn in the business cycle, protectionism, or the 1929 stock market crash in themselves but the collapse of the banking system during three waves of panics from 1930 to 1933.

In Age of Extremes, Marxist historian Eric Hobsbawm argues the crash to be a turning point in the history of the 20th century, going so far as to say the events of the 20th century are "incomprehensible" without understanding its impact. He suggests it would be unlikely for the Soviet economic system to be considered as a serious alternative to global capitalism without the interwar economic breakdown.

Hobsbawm writes extensively about the impact of post-crash mass unemployment on the world at large, especially as it pertained to national politics. From this mass unemployment, further demand for social programs and general security arose. Hobsbawm concludes that the long term consequence of the slump was seen in the loss of faith in the liberal economic system and the gold standard, symbolized in the United States adopting the Social Security Act of 1935, going so far as to say the proliferation of welfare and subsidies were the only reason for a lack of wide unrest. The only state that seemed unaffected by the crash and subsequent slump was the Soviet Union, but this was in spite of its inefficient economy and Stalinism's brutality rather than because of it. In fact, many economists and nations, such as Nazi Germany, began looking to the Soviet Union for its relative success in this time, going so far as to plagiarize the idea and language of "planning" the economy in a given amount of years, which demonstrates the earlier point of the Soviet system being viewed positively in contrast to capitalism.

== See also ==
- Banking Act of 1935
- Causes of the Great Depression
- Criticism of the Federal Reserve
- Great Contraction (1929–1933)
- List of largest daily changes in the Dow Jones Industrial Average
