= Trading curb =

Regulatory instrument to prevent stock market crashes

A trading curb (also known as a circuit breaker in Wall Street parlance) is a financial regulatory instrument that the relevant stock exchange organization implements to prevent stock market crashes. Since their inception, circuit breakers have been modified to prevent both speculative gains and dramatic losses within a small time frame. When triggered, circuit breakers either stop trading for a small amount of time or close trading early to allow accurate information to flow among market makers and for institutional traders to assess their positions and make rational decisions.

== United States ==
=== Description ===
On the New York Stock Exchange (NYSE), one type of trading curb is referred to as a "circuit breaker". These limits were put in place beginning in January 1988 (weeks after Black Monday occurred in 1987) in order to reduce market volatility and massive panic sell-offs, giving traders time to reconsider their transactions. The regulatory filing that makes circuit breakers mandatory on United States stock exchanges is Securities and Exchange Commission Rule 80B, which lays out the specifics of circuit breakers and price limits.

The most recently updated amendment of rule 80B went into effect on April 8, 2013, and has three tiers of thresholds that have different protocols for halting trading and closing the markets.

At the start of each day, the NYSE sets three circuit breaker levels: Level 1 is 7%, Level 2 is 13%, and Level 3 is 20%. These thresholds are percentage drops in the S&P 500 Index, relative to the value at the close of the preceding trading day. Level 1 and 2 declines each cause at least a 15-minute halt in trading (unless they occur after 3:25 pm, in which case no halt occurs). A maximum of one halt per level can occur each day. A Level 3 decline will halt trading for the remainder of the day.

Circuit breakers are also in effect on the Chicago Mercantile Exchange (CME) and all subsidiary exchanges where the same thresholds that the NYSE has are applied to equity index futures trading. However, there is a CME-specific price limit that prevents 7% increases and decreases in price during after hours trading. Base prices for which the percentage thresholds are applied are derived from the weighted average price on the future during the preceding trading day's last thirty seconds of trading. Price limits for equity index and foreign exchange futures are posted on the CME website at the close of each trading session.

There is a security-specific circuit breaker system, similar to the market wide system, that is known as the "Limit Up – Limit Down Plan" (LULD). This LULD system succeeds the previous system that only prevented dramatic losses, but not speculative gains, in a short amount of time. This rule is in place to combat security-specific volatility as opposed to market wide volatility. The thresholds for a trading halt on an individual security are as follows. Each percentage change in value has to occur within a 5-minute window in order for a trading halt to be enacted:

- 10% change in value of any security that is included in the S&P 500, the Russell 1000 Index, and the Invesco QQQ.
- 30% change in value of any security that has a price equal to or greater than $1
- 50% change in value of any security that has a price less than $1

The previous trading day's closing price is used to determine which price range a specific security falls into.

=== Founding ===
Following the Black Monday stock market crash on October 19, 1987, the United States President Ronald Reagan assembled a Task Force on Market Mechanisms, known as the Brady Commission, to investigate the causes of the crash. The Brady Commission's report had four main findings, one of which stated that whatever regulatory agency was chosen to monitor equity markets should be responsible for designing and implementing price limit systems known as circuit breakers. The original intent of circuit breakers was not to prevent dramatic but fair price swings, rather to allow time for sufficient communication between traders and specialists. In the days leading up to the crash, price swings were dramatic but not crisis-like. However, on Black Monday the crash was caused by lack of information flow through the markets among other discrepancies such as lack of uniform margin trading rules across different markets.

=== Instances of use ===
On October 27, 1997, under the trading curb rules then in effect, trading at the New York Stock Exchange was halted early after the Dow Jones Industrial Average declined by 550 points. This was the first time US stock markets had closed early due to trading curbs.

Since 1997, circuit breakers have evolved from a Dow Jones Industrial Average points-based system into a percentage change system that tracks the S&P 500.

Then-SEC Chairman Arthur Levitt Jr. believes this use was unnecessary, and that market price levels had increased so much since circuit breakers were implemented that the point based system triggered a halt for a decline that was not considered a crisis. Some, like Robert R. Glauber, suggested in the aftermath of the circuit breaker tripping that trigger points be increased, and automatically reset by formula on an annual basis.

On March 9, 2020, the Dow Jones fell by 7.79% (2,013 points) on fears of the COVID-19 coronavirus and falling oil prices, and the S&P 500 triggered a market shutdown for 15 minutes just moments after opening. On March 12, and again on March 16, early trading again tripped the level-1 circuit breaker when the markets dropped over 7%. On March 18, the breaker was triggered again at 1 p.m., several hours after trading opened.

=== Program trading curbs ===
The NYSE formerly implemented a curb on program trading under certain conditions. A program trade is defined by the NYSE as a basket of stocks from the S&P 500 where there are at least 15 stocks or where the value of the basket is at least $1 million. Such trades are generally automated.

When activated, the curbs restricted program trades to sell on upticks and buy only on downticks.

The trading curbs would become activated whenever the NYSE Composite Index moved 190 points or the Dow Jones Industrial Average moved 2% from its previous close. They remained in place for the rest of the trading day or until the NYSE Composite Index moved to within 90 points or the Dow moved within 1% of the previous close.

Since over 50% of all trades on the NYSE are program trades, this curb was supposed to limit volatility by mitigating the ability of automated trades to drive stock prices down via positive feedback.

This curb was fairly common, and financial television networks such as CNBC often referred to it with the term "curbs in".

On November 7, 2007, the NYSE confirmed that the exchange has scrapped this rule from November 2, 2007. The reason given for the rule's elimination was its ineffectiveness in its purpose of curbing market volatility since it was enacted in the wake of the 1987 stock market crash under the belief that it may help prevent another catastrophic market crash.

== Japan ==
In Japan, stock trading will be halted in cases where the criteria for the circuit breaker trigger are met. The trading halt time is 10 minutes.

=== Instances of use ===
On April 7th, 2025, early trading after United States tariffs on the rest of the world were announced tripped the circuit breaker which halted future trading for the day.

== China ==
A "circuit-breaker" mechanism was tested from January 1-8, 2016. If the CSI 300 Index rises or falls by 5% before 14:45 (15 minutes before normal closing), stock trading will halt for 15 minutes. If it happens after 14:45 or the index change reaches 7% at any time, trading will close immediately for the day. "Full breaking" was triggered on January 4 and 7, 2016. From January 8, use of the circuit-breaker was suspended.

== Philippines ==
The Philippine Stock Exchange (PSE) adopted a circuit breaker mechanism in September 2008. Under the mechanism stock trading may be halted for 15 minutes if the (PSE) falls at least 10% based on the previous day's closing index value. Trading may be halted only once per market session and not 30 minutes prior to noon or the trade closing. Trading has been halted only twice. The first time was on October 27, 2008 during the 2008 financial crisis when PSE index fell 10.33%, and the second time was on March 12, 2020 as a result of the uncertainty caused by the coronavirus pandemic.

== Effectiveness ==
Though the purpose behind circuit breakers is to stop trading so that traders can take time to think and digest new information, there are a lot of tested theories that show trading volume actually increases as price levels approach a circuit breaker threshold, and trading after a halt completes lays the groundwork for even more volatile market conditions.

=== Magnet effect ===
In a 2004 article published by the Journal of Financial Markets, Michael A. Goldstein and Kenneth A. Kavajecz have developed what is known as the "magnet effect". This theory claims that the closer market levels come to a circuit breaker threshold, the more exacerbated the situation will become as traders will increase volume by unloading shares out of fear that they will be stuck in their positions if markets do stop trading.

It is believed there was an institutional bias to circuit breakers, as all of the large banks, hedge funds, and even some pension funds had designated floor traders on the floor of the NYSE who can continue trading while the markets are closed to the average investor. This argument is becoming less relevant over time as the use of floor traders diminishes and the majority of trading is done by computer generated algorithms.

=== Price discovery ===
Price discovery as it relates to equities is the process in which a security's market value is determined by way of buyers and sellers agreeing on a price suitable enough for a transaction to take place. On the New York Stock Exchange alone, it is not uncommon for over $1.5 trillion of stocks to be traded in a single day. Due to the large amount of transactions that take place every day, experienced traders and computers using algorithmic trading make trades based on the slightest up-ticks and down-ticks in price, as well as subtle changes in the bid–ask spread. When trading halts for any amount of time, the flow of information is reduced due to a lack of market activity, adversely causing larger than normal bid-ask spreads that slow down the price discovery process. When stock-specific trading halts occur in order for press releases to be announced, the market has to then make a very quick assessment of how the new information affects the value of the underlying asset, leading to abnormal trading volume and volatility.

== See also ==
- Stock market crash
- Trading halt
- 2010 Flash Crash, after which the SEC announced a trial period of per-stock trading curbs
