= November 1929 =

Month of 1929

<<	November 1929					>>
Su	Mo	Tu	We	Th	Fr	Sa
					1	2
3	4	5	6	7	8	9
10	11	12	13	14	15	16
17	18	19	20	21	22	23
24	25	26	27	28	29	30

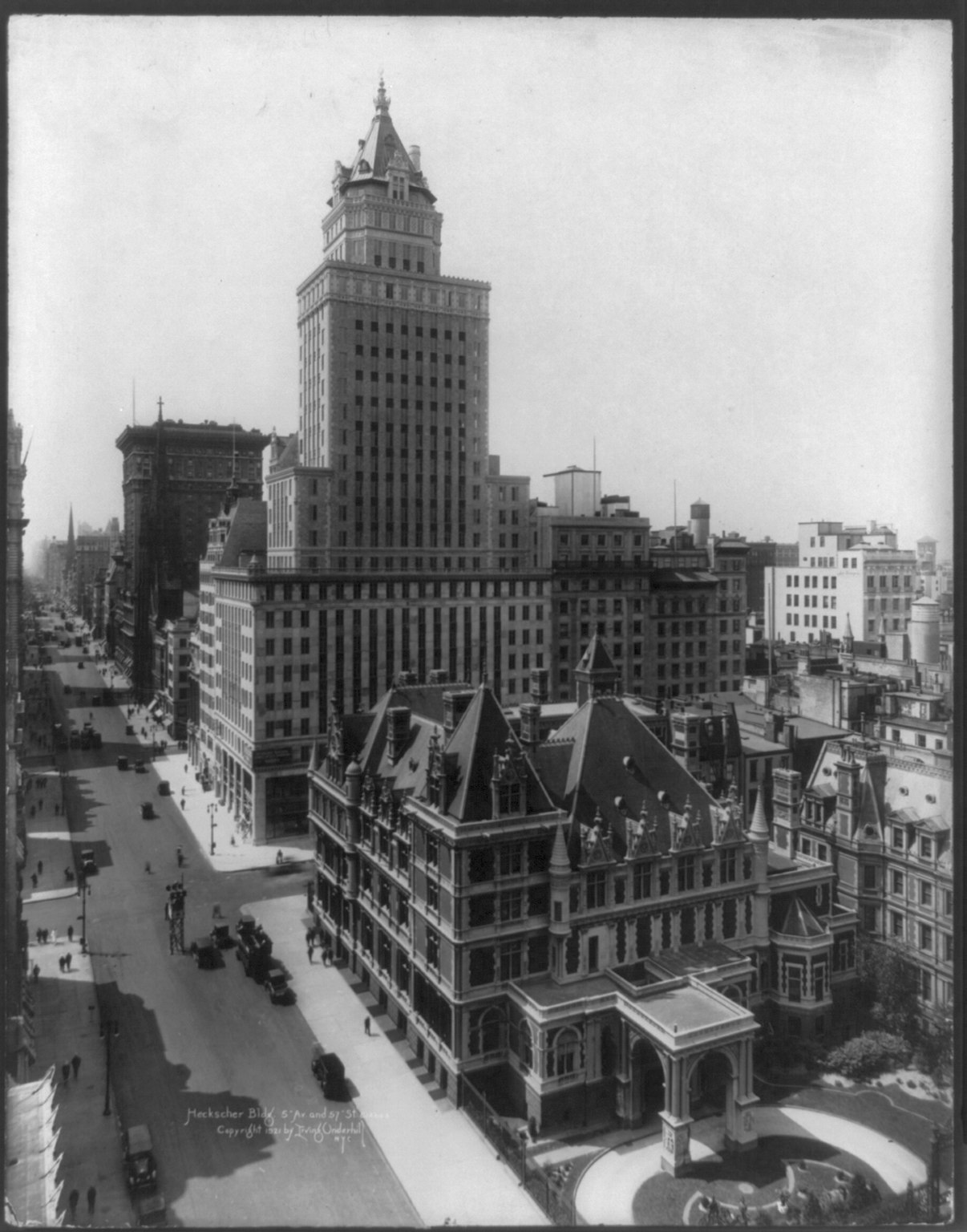
November 7, 1929: New York City's Museum of Modern Art (MoMA) opens in the 26-story Heckscher building

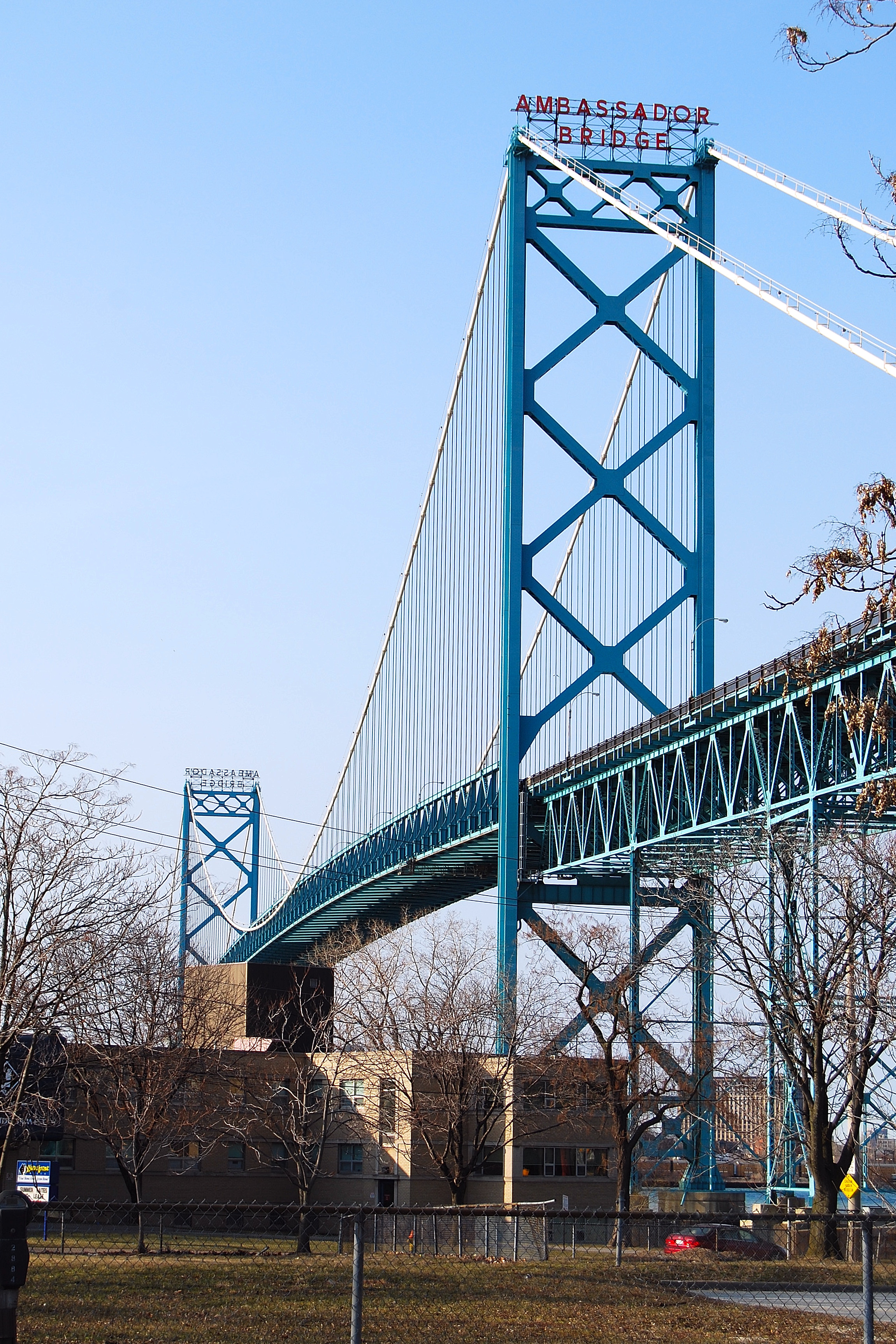
November 11, 1929: The Ambassador Bridge between the U.S. and Canada opens to traffic at Detroit, Michigan and Windsor, Ontario

The following events occurred in November 1929:

== Friday, November 1, 1929 ==
- Germany and Poland signed an agreement settling frontier questions of an economic nature.
- Australia ended compulsory military service.
- André Tardieu became the third person within a week to try to form the next French government.
- The New York Stock Exchange stayed closed until Monday so a "clean up day" could be held to fix bookkeeping errors that had been made during the avalanche of transactions over the past few days.

== Saturday, November 2, 1929 ==
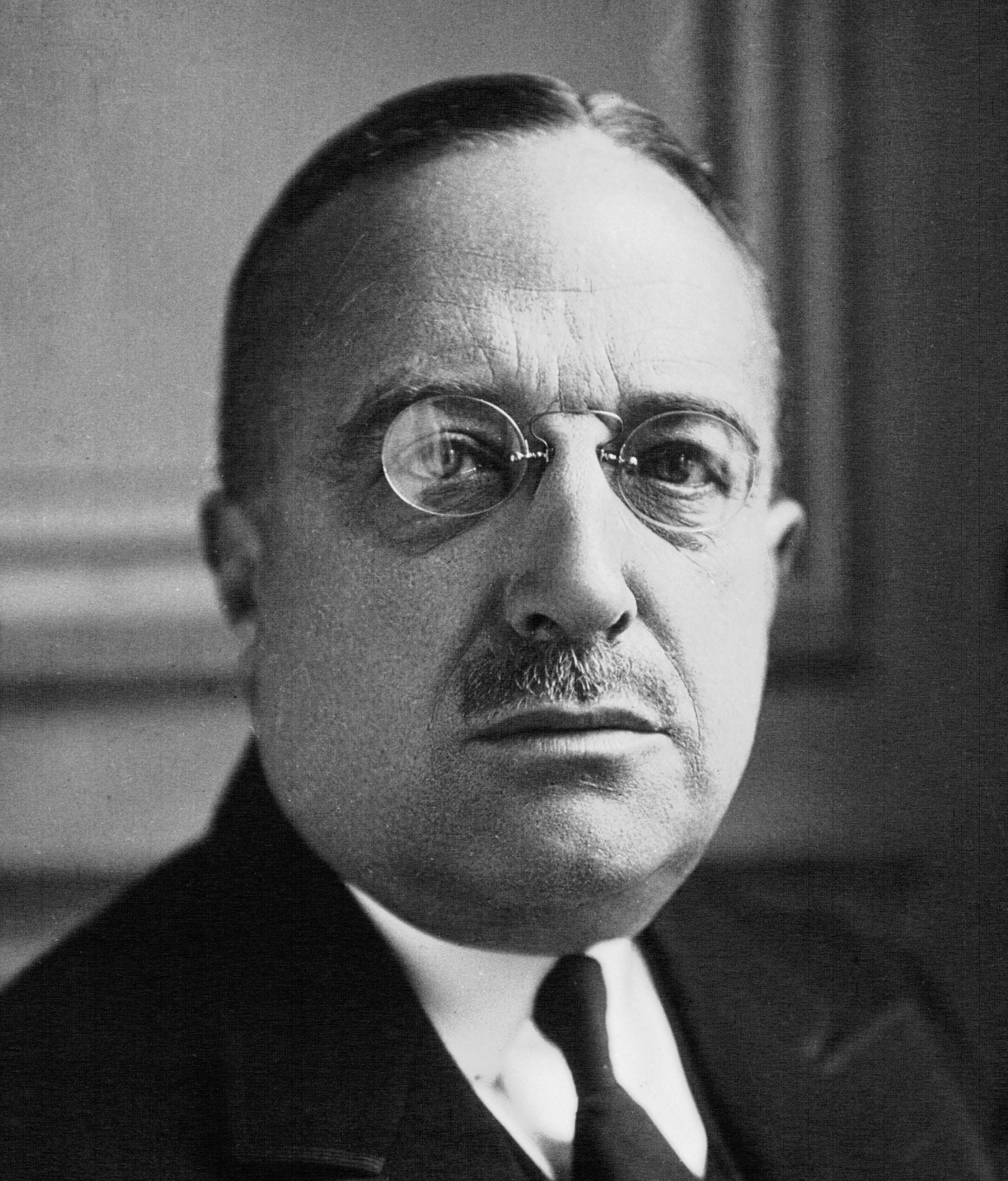
Prime Minister Tardieu

- André Tardieu became 97th Prime Minister of France. The previous prime minister, Aristide Briand, was retained as foreign minister.
- Official returns showed that the anti-Young Plan referendum narrowly surpassed the threshold to make it binding on the Reichstag. 10% of Germany's eligible voters had to subscribe to the referendum, and it passed that mark by less than 1 percent. The prospects of the referendum actually succeeding were still very low, since a turnout of 50% would be required to make it pass.
- Born:
  - Richard E. Taylor, Canadian physicist and 1990 Nobel Prize in Physics laureate; in Medicine Hat, Alberta (d. 2018)
  - Rachel Ames (stage name for Rachel Kay Foulger), American soap opera actress; in Portland, Oregon

== Sunday, November 3, 1929 ==
- The former Emir of Afghanistan, Habibullāh Kalakāni, who had surrendered to the new Emir, Nadir Shah on condition of having his life spared, was executed by a firing squad.
- German National People's Party members in Berlin publicly celebrated their success in obtaining enough signatures to trigger the anti-Young Plan referendum. Fighting then broke out in Berlin between Der Stahlhelm and German Communists.
- During ceremonies marking the eleventh anniversary of the Italian armistice, Benito Mussolini told wounded veterans that pacifist movement discussions could not be trusted. "There is a lot of peace talk going on in the world these days, I dare say too much! We must not be deluded by all these sort of things. The truth is that nobody is frankly and effectively disarming," he said.

== Monday, November 4, 1929 ==
- Connecticut U.S. Senator Hiram Bingham III was censured by his colleagues by a 54–22 vote for allowing a paid lobbyist to accompany him during closed-session meetings of the Smoot-Hawley tariff subcommittee.
- Stock market trading returned to a manageable volume of 6.1 million shares. The Dow Jones Industrial Average fell 5.79%, snuffing the brief rally that followed the crash, as an expected buying frenzy failed to materialize.
- The Civic Opera Building opened in Chicago.
- Died: Mary Solari, 80, Italian-American artist

== Tuesday, November 5, 1929 ==
- The British House of Commons voted 324–199 to recognize the Soviet Union.
- The largest electrified railway in the British Empire opened in India, running 116 miles between Bombay and Pune.
- Jimmy Walker was easily re-elected Mayor of New York City over Fiorello H. La Guardia by a record plurality of 497,165 votes.

== Wednesday, November 6, 1929 ==
- The stock market plummeted another 9.92%.
- At Dessau, the large German transport plane Junkers G.38 made its first flight. In an aviation first, space for passengers was included inside the plane's wings.
- Born: June Squibb, actress, in Vandalia, Illinois
- Died: Prince Maximilian of Baden, 62, German prince and politician

== Thursday, November 7, 1929 ==
- The Museum of Modern Art opened inside the Herckscher Building at 730 Fifth Avenue near West 57th Street in Manhattan. In 1939, a larger building would be constructed at 11 West 53rd Street near Sixth Avenue.
- The musical comedy film Paris, based on the Cole Porter stage production of the same name, was released. Four of the original ten reels were originally in Technicolor.
- Born:
  - Dr. Eric Kandel, Austrian-born U.S. neuropsychiatrist and 2000 Nobel Prize laureate; in Vienna;
  - Lila Kaye, English stage and TV actress; in Middlesbrough (d. 2012)
- Died: Prince Eugen of Schaumburg-Lippe, 30, died one day after being fatally injured in a plane crash that killed 6 other people.

== Friday, November 8, 1929 ==
- Albert Einstein received an honorary doctorate from the Sorbonne in Paris.
- James J. Riordan, president of the County Trust Company and a friend of former presidential candidate Al Smith, took a pistol from the teller's cage at his bank, went to his home in Manhattan and committed suicide. Though he left no note, those who knew him said he had been distraught after the Wall Street Crash. The news was suppressed until after the bank closed on Saturday to prevent a run by depositors. Riordan's suicide made front-page news in the Sunday papers and may have contributed to the popular but exaggerated image of mass waves of investors killing themselves after the crash.
- The Sam Wood-directed comedy film So This Is College was released.
- Born: Bobby Bowden, American college football coach who transformed the Florida State University program into a national champion, including NCAA championships in 1993 and 1999; in Birmingham, Alabama (d. 2021)

== Saturday, November 9, 1929 ==
- A Chinese report stated that Soviet troops had crossed the Amur River near Blagoveshchensk.
- Severe fighting with heavy losses on both sides was reported from Hunan Province in the Chinese Civil War.
- Born: Imre Kertész, Hungarian author and 2002 Nobel Prize in Literature laureate; in Budapest (d. 2016)

== Sunday, November 10, 1929 ==
- The cabinet council of Portugal pardoned 86 officers who had been exiled to the Azores for plotting against the government in 1927.
- The Harvard Economic Society said in a statement that "a serious depression like that of 1920–21 is outside the range of probability."

== Monday, November 11, 1929 ==
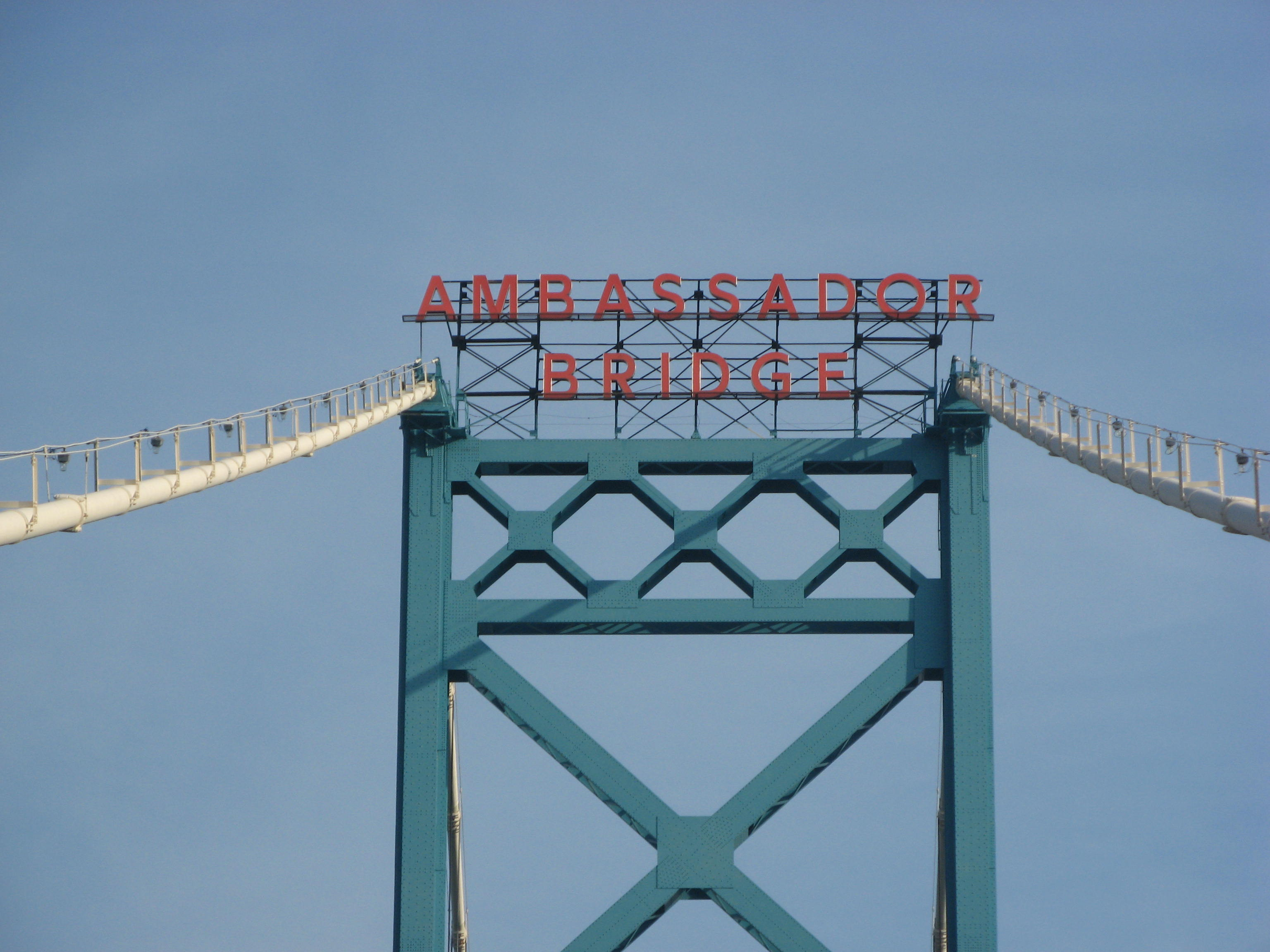

- The Ambassador Bridge connecting the U.S. city of Detroit with the Canadian city of Windsor, Ontario, was opened.
- Julius Curtius was formally appointed the new German Foreign Minister, filling the vacancy left by the death of Gustav Stresemann.
- Seattle's three largest banks merged to form the "First Seattle Dexter Horton National Bank". In the 1930s, the bank would be renamed the First National Bank of Seattle, then Seattle-First National Bank, then Firstbank. It is now Seafirst Bank.

== Tuesday, November 12, 1929 ==
- Students at Trinity College Dublin threw stink bombs when government officers arrived to sign up volunteers for the newly created Irish Free State reserve force, which Irish republicans opposed.
- Noted bearish trader Jesse Lauriston Livermore declared that stocks had been driven too low. "People throughout the country have become panic stricken and have thrown their sound securities over without regard to values. To my mind this situation should go no further", he explained. "There is nothing wrong with the country or the business of the country, and just because trade has slumped moderately after an extremely active summer is no reason why first class securities should be ruthlessly thrown into the market in such fashion as we have seen in the last few trading days."
- Born:
  - Grace Kelly, American actress and then Princess Grace of Monaco, in Philadelphia (killed in automobile accident, 1982)
  - Michael Ende, German fantasy and children's author, in Garmisch-Partenkirchen (d. 1995)

== Wednesday, November 13, 1929 ==
- The Wall Street Crash finally bottomed out when the Dow Jones Industrial Average closed at 198.69 points, only 52% of its value on September 3.
- A charter for the Bank for International Settlements was signed in Switzerland. Germany was to make its Young Plan payments through this bank.

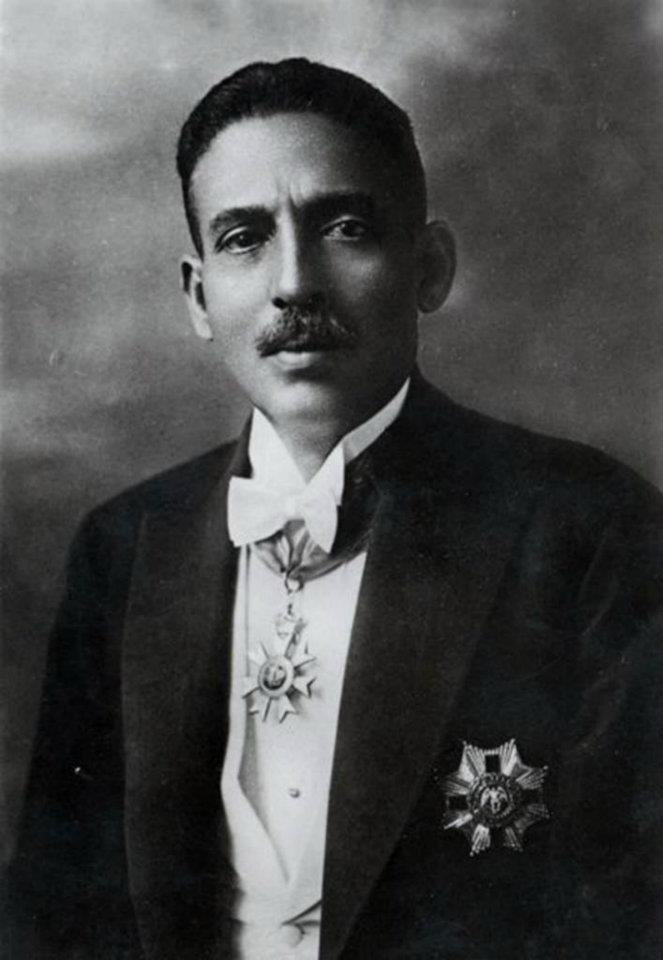
Prime Minister Al-Sa'dun

- Born: Fred Phelps, American pastor and civil rights activist; in Meridian, Mississippi (d. 2014)
- Died:
  - Abd al-Muhsin as-Sa'dun, 50, Prime Minister of Iraq, unpopular with both the Iraqi public and with British authorities and the international community, committed suicide with a self-inflicted gunshot wound to the head. He left a suicide note that stated, "I have suffered with forbearance all possible insults and contempt.
  - Richard Henry, 84, New Zealand conservationist and reserve manager
  - Princess Viktoria of Prussia, 63, daughter of Emperor Frederick III of Germany, granddaughter of Queen Victoria of the United Kingdom

== Thursday, November 14, 1929 ==
- The Italian Fascist government seized two large estates in the provinces of Arezzo and Taranto because their owners had failed to cultivate the land. "Property is not an end in itself. Those who own it have special duties with regard to the collectivity of the people, represented by the state", read the government decree.
- In Paris, actress Constance Bennett divorced her second husband, the millionaire socialite Philip Morgan Plant.
- Born: Jimmy Piersall, baseball player known for the book and film Fear Strikes Out; in Waterbury, Connecticut (d. 2017)
- Died: Joe McGinnity, 58, American baseball pitcher elected to the National Baseball Hall of Fame, from complications of surgery

== Friday, November 15, 1929 ==
- The front page of all newspapers owned by William Randolph Hearst ran "An Open Letter to President Hoover" written by Hearst himself, in which he proposed various methods to restore economic confidence. Hearst's primary solution was for the Federal Reserve to lower interest rates.
- President Hoover announced he was calling a conference of the nation's business leaders to meet with government departmental heads to discuss the economy.
- German Interior Minister Carl Severing announced December 22 as the date of the anti-Young Plan referendum.
- Born: Ed Asner, TV and film actor, later president of the Screen Actors Guild; as Eddie Asner in Kansas City, Missouri (d. 2021)

== Saturday, November 16, 1929 ==
- In Berlin, 10 were wounded and 20 arrested in fighting between political extremist factions on the eve of town council elections.
- International Chamber of Commerce President Dr. Albert Pirelli said in a speech in Rome that the Wall Street Crash posed a threat to European business, as diminished American purchasing power meant that auto manufacturers may attempt to dump their cars on the European market at cheap prices.

== Sunday, November 17, 1929 ==
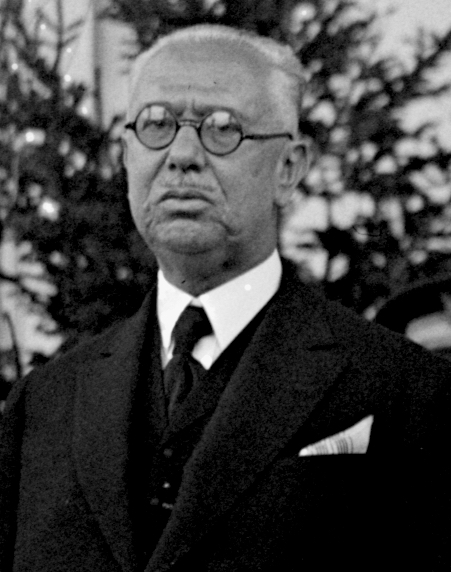
President-elect Ortiz

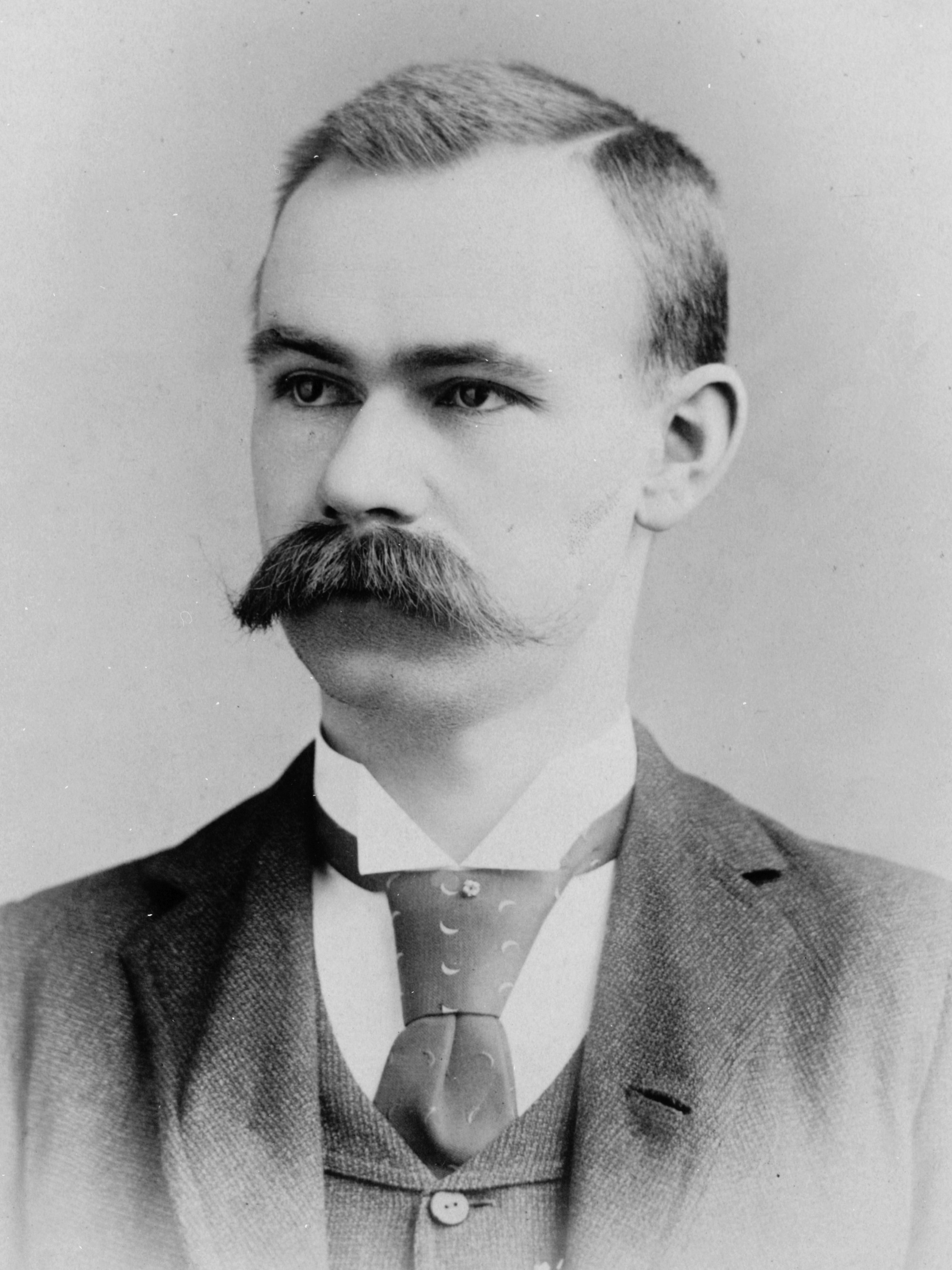
Data processing pioneer Hollerith

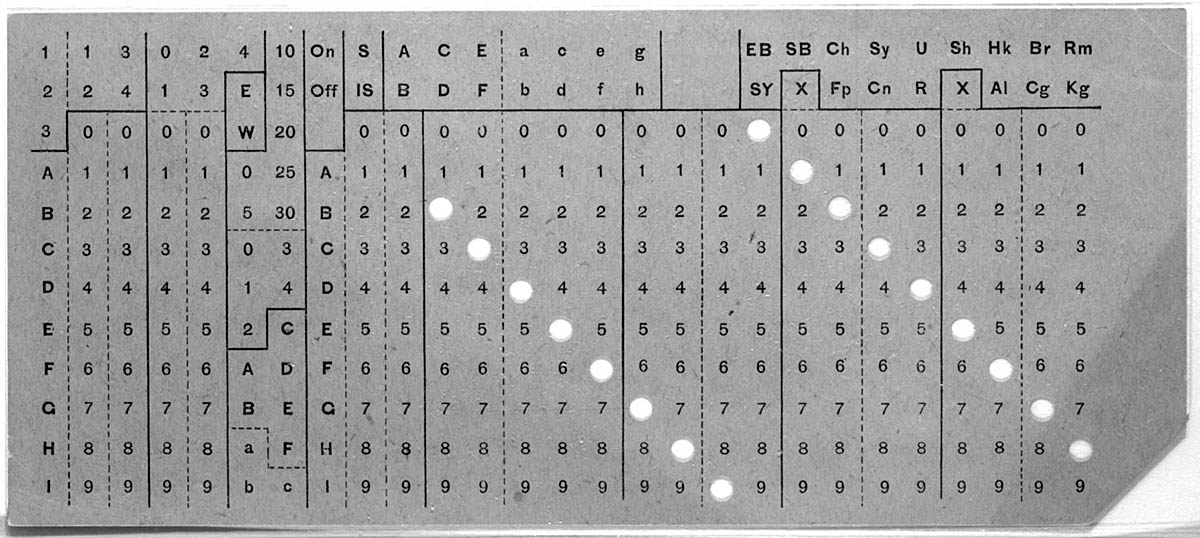
A punched "Hollerith card"

- Pascual Ortiz Rubio was elected President of Mexico by an overwhelming majority in general elections. Nineteen people were killed in election day rioting.
- At one o'clock in the morning, Soviet forces launched a strong attack against Chinese defenses near Manzhouli.
- Argentina defeated Uruguay 2–0 to win the South American football championship.
- The National Socialist Party of Germany, the Nazis, won 13 of 225 seats in Berlin town council elections.
- Born: Gorō Naya, Japanese actor, narrator and theatre director, in Hakodate, Hokkaido (d. 2013)
- Died: Herman Hollerith, 69, American businessman and inventor known for creating the Hollerith card, setting the model for punch cards that were later used for decades in computer programming, along with the first keypunch and the tabulating machine to process its data.

== Monday, November 18, 1929 ==
- The Grand Banks earthquake occurred in the Atlantic Ocean 265 kilometres off the coast of Newfoundland. The magnitude 7.2 earthquake created a tsunami that killed 28 people in southern Newfoundland, making it the worst recorded earthquake-related disaster in Canadian history.
- Naji al-Suwaydi became the new Prime Minister of Iraq.
- Born: John McMartin, actor, in Warsaw, Indiana (d. 2016)
- Died:
  - James W. Good, 63, the incumbent U.S. Secretary of War for President Hoover since March, died from peritonitis caused by a ruptured appendix
  - T. P. "Tay Pay" O'Connor, 81, Irish journalist and Member of the House of Commons of the United Kingdom of Great Britain and Ireland, initially for the Galway borough in Ireland's County Galway (1880 to 1885) and then for the Liverpool Scotland borough for the largely-Irish section of the English city of Liverpool since 1885.

== Tuesday, November 19, 1929 ==
- U.S. President Hoover held a conference in Washington with twelve American railway executives. Upon its conclusion Hoover announced that he had received assurances from the railway presidents that they would "proceed with full programs of construction and betterments without any reference to recent stock exchange fluctuations."
- The musical comedy film The Love Parade premiered at the Criterion Theatre in New York City.

== Wednesday, November 20, 1929 ==
- The Canadian National Railway announced a $20 million business plan to buy new transport cars and build new stations, despite a difficult year for the Canadian rail industry due to reduced transport of wheat and corn.
- Spanish surrealist painter Salvador Dalí had his first one-man Paris show.

== Thursday, November 21, 1929 ==
- The Dow Jones Industrial Average closed at 248.49 points after a week of steady recovery that helped to erase most of the losses incurred before October 29. The stock market would run mostly steady over the next year.
- President Hoover held a conference with representatives of business and organized labor in which he received pledges of peace from both sides in order to maintain business progress. Industries promised to make no wage reductions and labor groups likewise promised to make no wage increase demands.
- Harry F. Sinclair was freed from prison after serving 198 days for contempt of court. Sinclair released a written statement in which he continued to deny any wrongdoing.
- The French began the evacuation of the Koblenz bridgehead.
- The musical revue film The Show of Shows premiered at the Winter Garden Theatre in New York City.
- The musical film Pointed Heels, starring William Powell and Helen Kane, was released.

== Friday, November 22, 1929 ==
- The Central Executive Committee of the Soviet Union passed a measure saying that any Soviet citizens working or living abroad who refused an order to return to the country would be considered guilty of treason and would be shot when finally taken into custody.
- In Ohio, convicted murderer and former veterinarian James H. Snook was given an indefinite stay of execution pending review of his case. He had been scheduled for execution on November 29. Dr. Snook's temporary reprieve lasted for three months, and he would die in the electric chair at the Ohio Penitentiary on February 28.

== Saturday, November 23, 1929 ==
- President Hoover sent a telegram to every U.S. governor saying that "It would be helpful if road, street, public building, and other construction of this type could be speeded up and adjusted in such fashion as to further employment."
- Born:
  - Gloria Lynne (stage name for Gloria Wilson), African-American jazz singer; in Harlem, New York City (d. 2013)
  - Laurdine Patrick, African-American jazz musician; in East Moline, Illinois (d. 1991)

== Sunday, November 24, 1929 ==
- The Soviet Union announced via radio broadcast its terms for the cessation of hostilities with China. They called for a restoration of the Chinese Eastern Railway to the status prior to July 11, a withdrawal of Chinese forces from the frontier, disarmament of White Russian troops on Chinese soil and the release of all imprisoned Soviet citizens.
- Born: Franciszek Kokot, Polish nephrologist and endocrinologist, in Rosenberg, Opavian Silesia, Germany (now Olesno in Poland), (d. 2021)

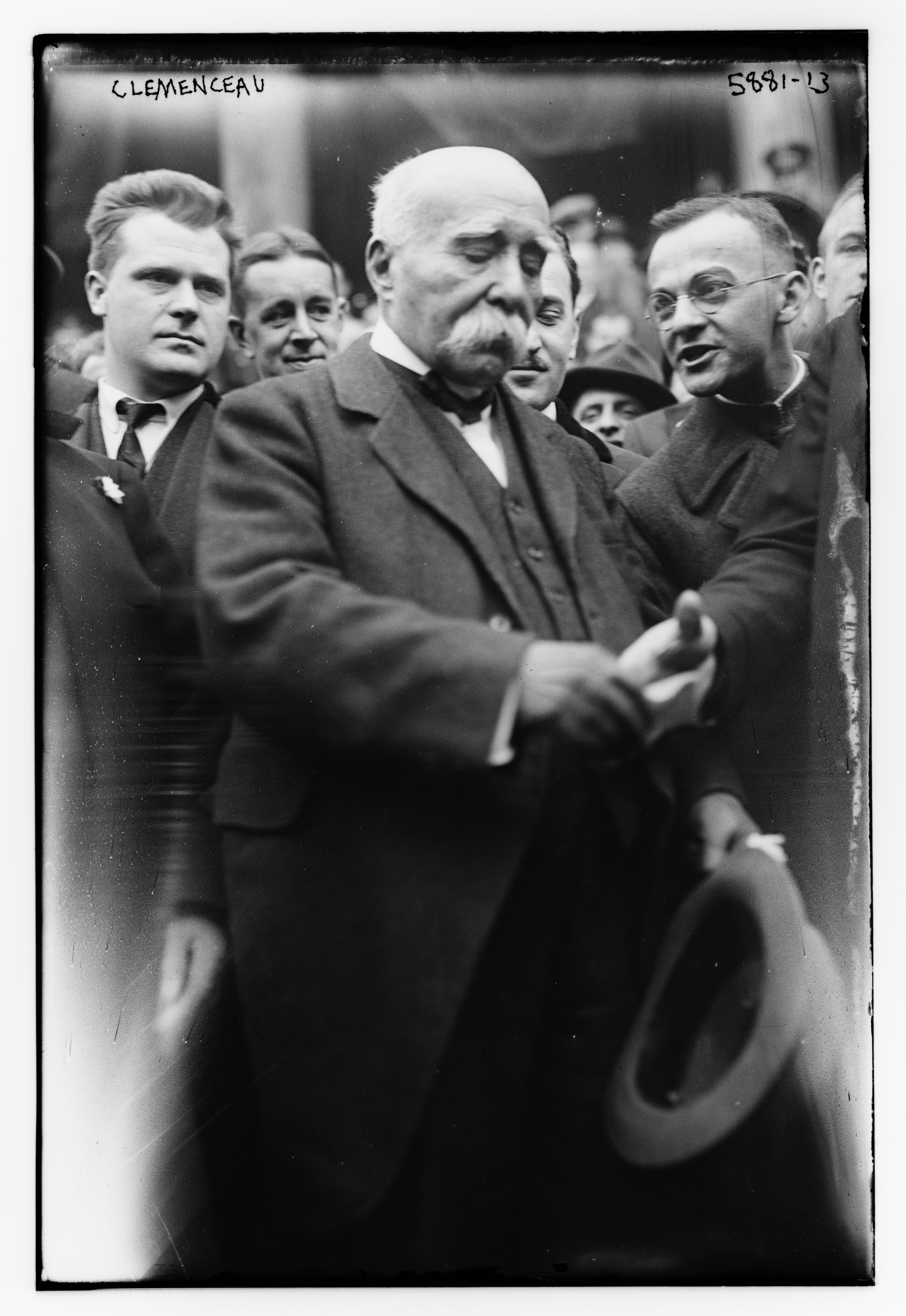
Clemenceau

- Died:
  - Georges Clemenceau, 88, Prime Minister of France as well as the nation's Minister of War during and after World War One (1917 to 1920); previously Prime Minister 1906 to 1909.
  - Raymond Hitchcock, 64, American stage and silent film actor
  - F. E. Warren, 85, U.S. Senator for Wyoming since 1895; the last Governor of the Wyoming Territory and the first Governor of the state of Wyoming; recipient of the Medal of Honor for heroism during the Civil War

== Monday, November 25, 1929 ==
- Georges Clemenceau was buried in Vendée next to his father in a small ceremony attended by only 20 people, in accordance with his wishes to eschew a state funeral. A 101-gun salute in Paris was the only official tribute. Clemenceau had also requested to be buried upright facing the sea so he could remain standing up as he did in life, but the grave could not be dug deep enough due to solid rock in the burial plot and so he was buried in the usual horizontal orientation.
- The 6,997-ton oil tanker British Chemist exploded in Grangemouth port in Scotland, shaking the town but causing no casualties.
- The League of Nations opened a conference on the transportation of magazines and newspapers, trying to ensure the free flow of information across borders.
- In the first attempted homicide ever recorded in Vatican City, a Swedish woman in St. Peter's Basilica tried to shoot an archbishop that had disappointed her after she had approached him requesting employment. She was believed to have a mental disorder.
- A district court in Cambridge, Massachusetts, found two men guilty of obscenity for selling the D H Lawrence novel Lady Chatterley's Lover. The owner of the bookstore and the clerk were both ordered to pay fines and serve jail sentences of four months and two weeks, respectively. The conviction triggered a public backlash against the Watch and Ward Society which had instigated the legal proceedings in the case.

== Tuesday, November 26, 1929 ==
- The Chinese government submitted an appeal to the League of Nations and signatories of the Kellogg-Briand Pact urging that steps be taken to punish the Soviet Union for its aggression in Manchuria.
- The comedy-drama musical film The Vagabond Lover, Rudy Vallée's first feature film, premiered at the Globe Theatre in New York City.

== Wednesday, November 27, 1929 ==
- The ocean liner RMS Mauretania, departing from New York en route to Europe, collided with a car ferry near Robbins Reef Light. There were no casualties but the ferry sank and a pair of holes were ripped into the Mauretania, requiring it to return to New York for repairs.

== Thursday, November 28, 1929 ==
- American explorer Richard E. Byrd and three companions made the first flight over the South Pole, flying from the Ross Ice Shelf and back in 18 hours 41 minutes. Captain Byrd, 41 at the time, was subsequently promoted to the rank of Rear Admiral, the youngest admiral in U.S. Navy history.
- The Greek government shut down the University of Athens for five days as a punitive measure for recent student riots.
- Benito Mussolini barred extravagant speech from the Italian legislature, explaining that "the government does not want any eulogies or serenades. Let the speeches be to the point, loyal and intelligent. Both I and the government hate flattery and violinlike speeches. We like rude, frank talk. It is becoming to Fascism."
- American football player Ernie Nevers scored an NFL record 40 points (6 rushing touchdowns, plus 4 extra points) for the Chicago Cardinals as they routed the Chicago Bears, 40 to 6 at Comiskey Park in front of 8,000 spectators.
- Born: Berry Gordy, U.S. record producer and songwriter, founder of Motown Records; in Detroit

== Friday, November 29, 1929 ==
- Julius Curtius made his first speech as Foreign Minister in front of the Reichstag, vowing to carry out the Young Plan. He also criticized the "Liberty Law" that nationalists were trying to force on the government through referendum, speaking of "the foolishness of asking the farmer or the worker whether he wants to pay or not. Naturally he does not want to pay, but the fact is that he must pay. Only through the loyal fulfillment of the obligations we have contracted and those we shall contract can we find a guarantee for the further ascent of our nation."
- The Rodin Museum was inaugurated in Philadelphia the largest display in the U.S. of the sculptures of France's Auguste Rodin.

== Saturday, November 30, 1929 ==
- The evacuation of the Koblenz region in Germany was completed, leaving the nation completely free of occupation soldiers for the first time since 1920.
- The Reichstag, as expected, overwhelmingly voted against the "Liberty Law". Nevertheless, the measure still had a chance to pass via the December 22 public referendum that was required to be held under German law.
- As Soviet planes bombed the Manchurian town of Pokutu, one bomb struck a train bearing the American Red Cross committee. Many were killed but the committee chairman was unharmed.
- The Hamilton Tigers beat the Regina Roughriders 14–3 to win the 17th Grey Cup of Canadian football.
- Born: Dick Clark, radio and television personality known for American Bandstand and for successive annual New Year's Rockin' Eve telecasts from Times Square; in Mount Vernon, New York (d. 2012)
