= February 1930 =

Month of 1930

<<	February 1930					>>
Su	Mo	Tu	We	Th	Fr	Sa
						1
2	3	4	5	6	7	8
9	10	11	12	13	14	15
16	17	18	19	20	21	22
23	24	25	26	27	28

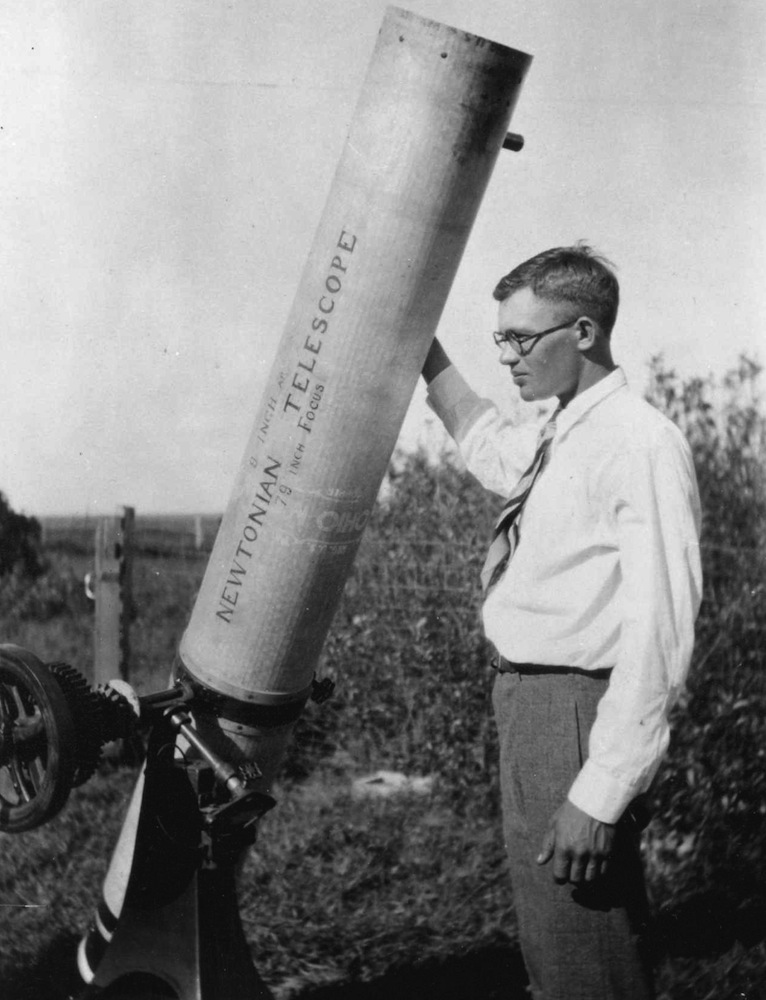
February 18, 1930: Astronomer Clyde Tombaugh discovers a ninth planet, Pluto

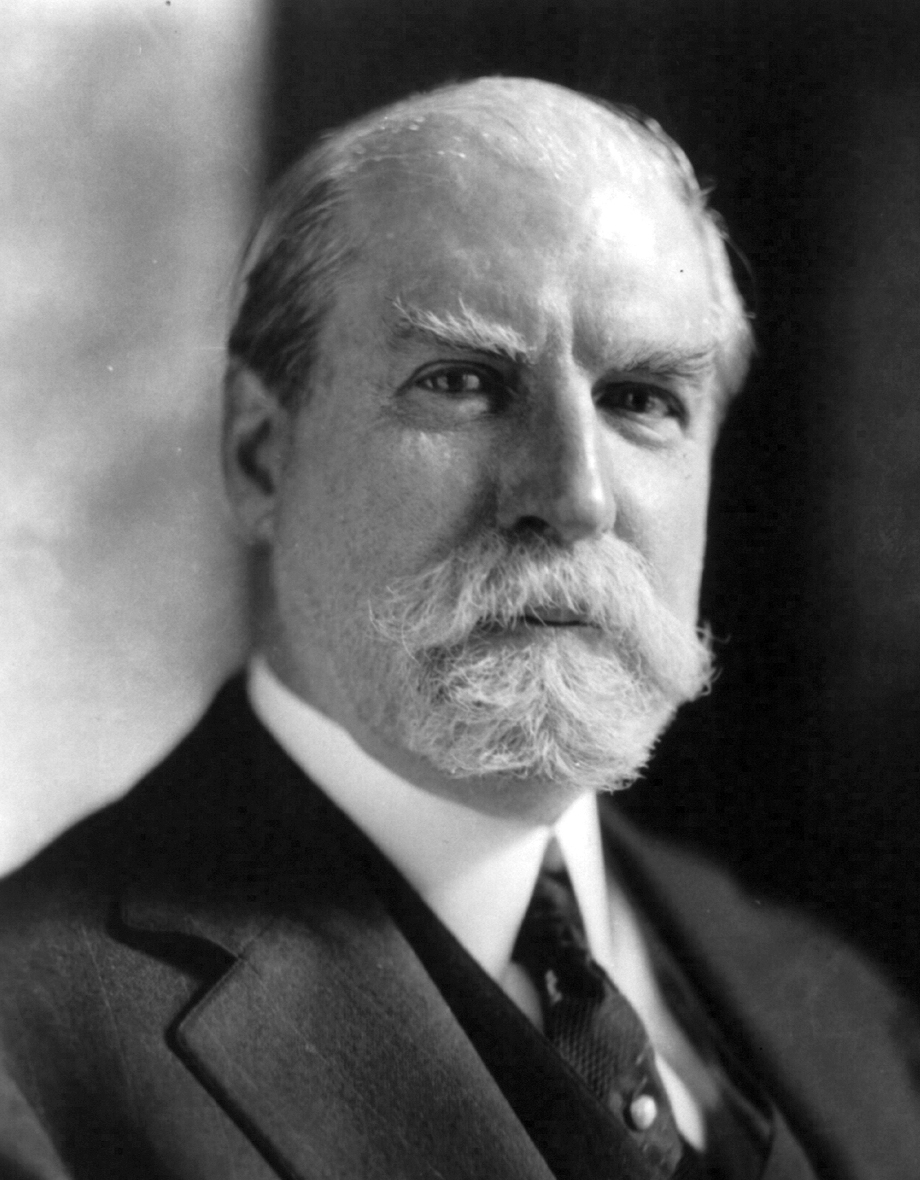
February 13, 1930: Charles Evans Hughes, who lost the 1916 U.S. presidential election to Woodrow Wilson, confirmed as new Chief Justice of the Supreme Court to replace William Howard Taft, who lost the 1912 U.S. presidential election to Woodrow Wilson

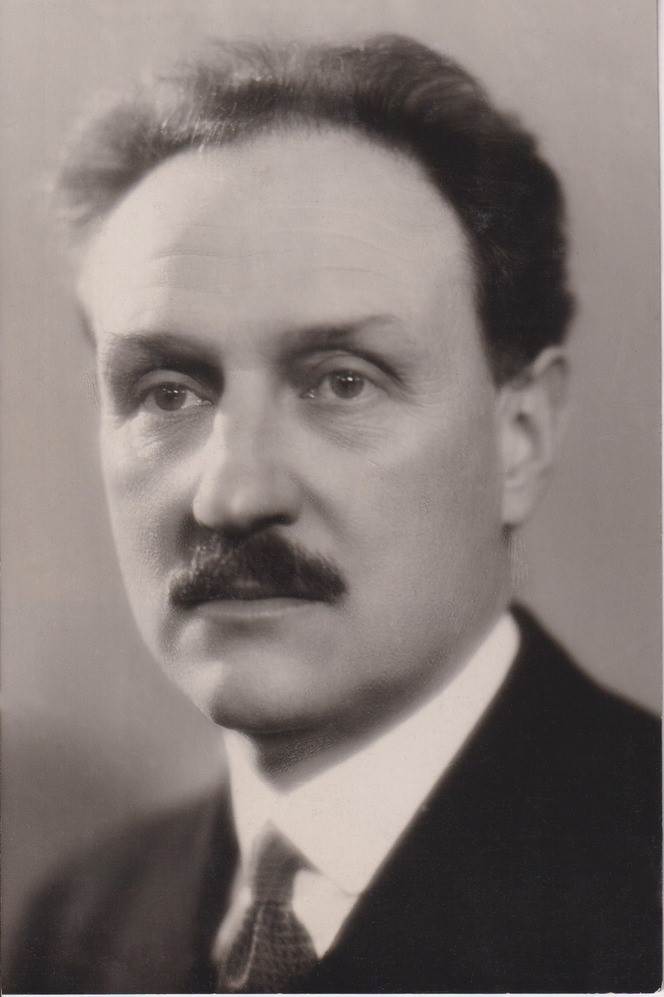
February 21, 1930: Camille Chautemps becomes Prime Minister of France, government collapses 10 days later

The following events occurred in February 1930:

== Saturday, February 1, 1930 ==
- The Soviet Union continued its crackdown on kulaks as it issued a decree forbidding kulak households to sell their property and leave their district before authorities got around to expropriating their assets.
- A bomb was found at the British Museum, and was attributed to Indian nationalists.
- Born: Hussain Muhammad Ershad, President of Bangladesh from 1983 to 1990; in Dinhata, British India (d. 2019)

== Sunday, February 2, 1930 ==
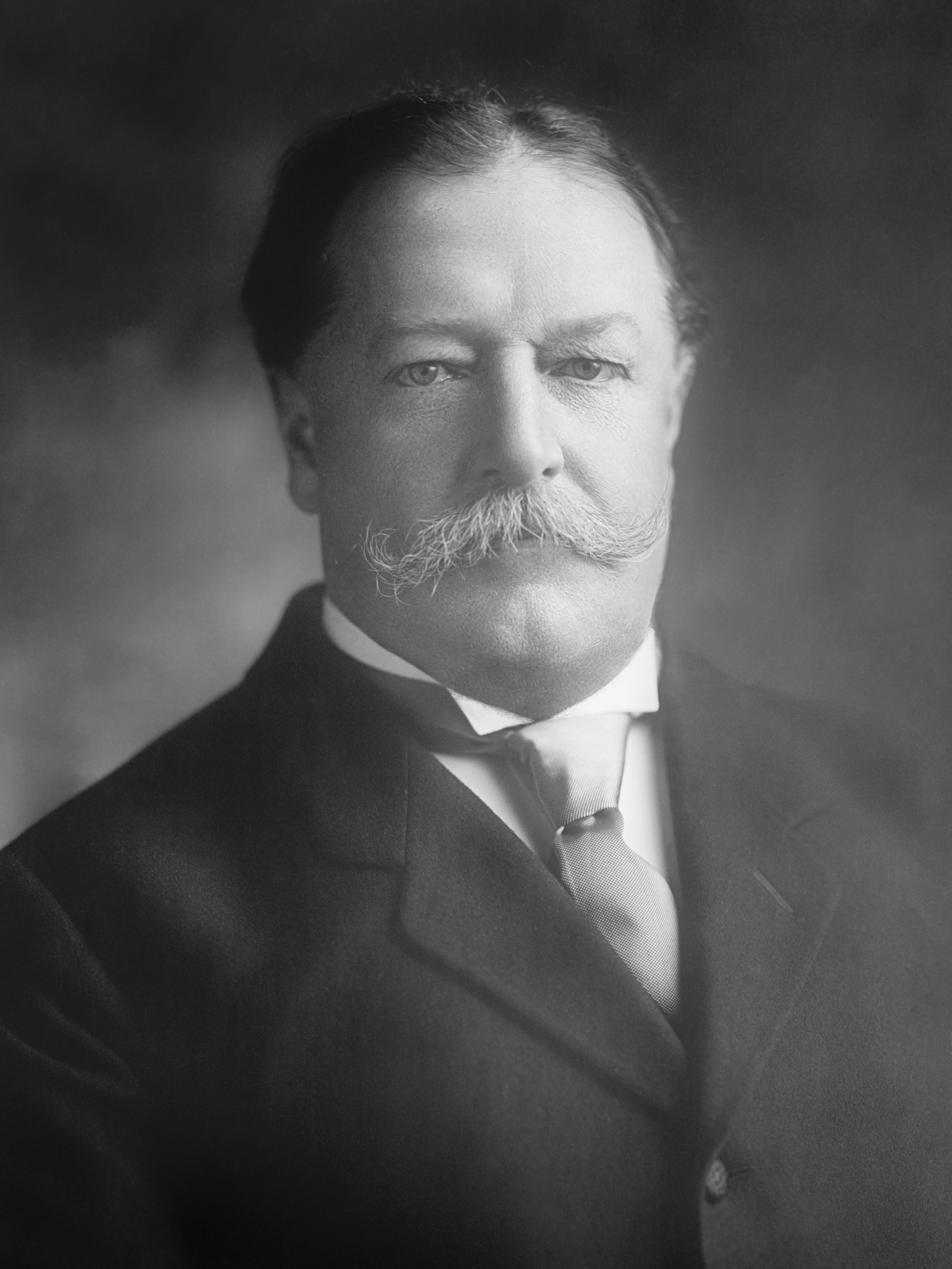
Chief Justice and former U.S. President Taft

- William Howard Taft resigned as Chief Justice of the United States due to failing health.

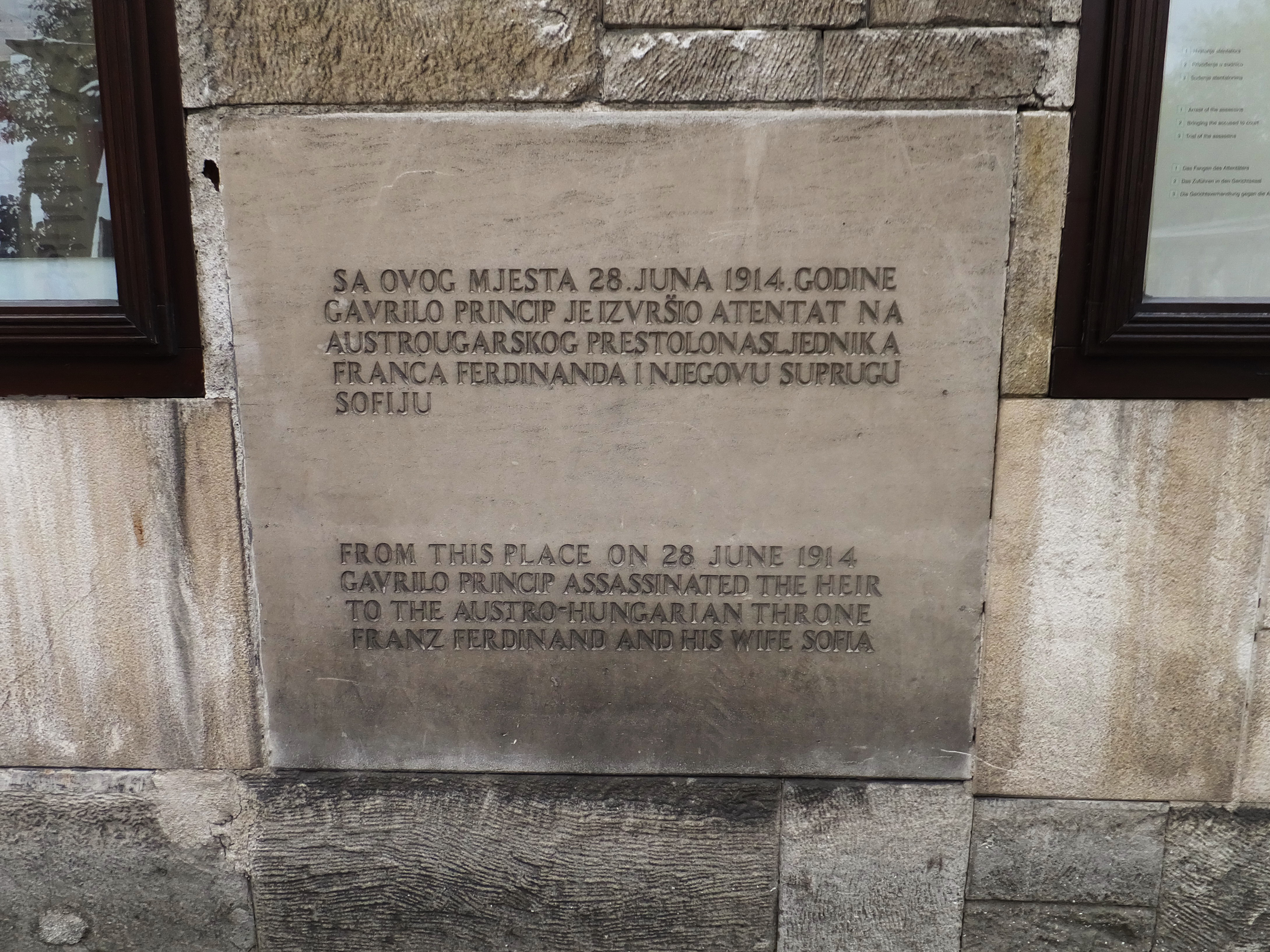
The plaque

- A controversial plaque was unveiled in Sarajevo honoring Gavrilo Princip, the assassin of Archduke Franz Ferdinand of Austria. The plaque was located at the site of the assassination and bore an inscription saying that Princip had initiated liberty there on June 28, 1914. The Yugoslav government disavowed any connection to the plaque and said it was a private memorial.

== Monday, February 3, 1930 ==
- The Communist Party of Vietnam was established by merger of the Communist Party of Indochina, the Communist Party of Annam and the Communist League of Indochina.
- U.S. President Herbert Hoover nominated Charles Evans Hughes to be the new Chief Justice of the United States.
- Born: Akbar Etemad, Iranian nuclear physicist who pioneered that nation's nuclear program; in Hamadan. (d. 2025)
- Died: Michele Bianchi, 46, Italian Fascist leader

== Tuesday, February 4, 1930 ==
- The Prussian Minister of the Interior, Albert Grzesinski, forbade members of subversive parties and organizations to hold leading positions in local government. The regulation was mainly aimed at Nazis and Communists.
- The American School of the Air, the first half-hour educational radio program, made its debut on the CBS Radio Network at 2:30 in the afternoon Eastern time, to be listened to on radios in school classrooms nationwide. The program would run until 1948.

== Wednesday, February 5, 1930 ==
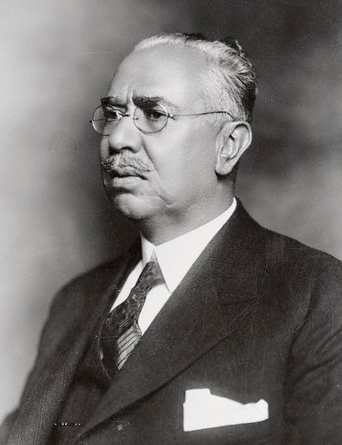
Pascual Ortiz, sworn in and wounded on same day

- Pascual Ortiz Rubio became President of Mexico. Two hours after Ortiz took the oath of office, a gunman fired six shots at the presidential car, wounding him in the jaw. The assailant was quickly arrested. Serving in a figurehead role for Plutarco Elias Calles, Ortiz would resign the presidency on September 4, 1932.
- The World Figure Skating Championships ended in New York City. Sonja Henie of Norway won the ladies' competition for the fourth straight year, while Karl Schäfer of Austria won the men's competition.
- Died: Naum Faiq Palak, 62, prominent Assyrian nationalist (lung disease)

== Thursday, February 6, 1930 ==
- The Bank of England lowered its discount rate from 5 to 4.5% to encourage trade; the Federal Reserve Bank of New York followed the same day with a reduction to 4.5 to 4%.
- Austria and Italy signed a treaty of friendship.
- The new Spanish government announced an amnesty for all political prisoners.
- Born: Allan King, Canadian documentary film director; in Vancouver (d. 2009)

== Friday, February 7, 1930 ==
- Fernando de Melo Viana, the Vice President of Brazil since 1926, was seriously wounded after being shot three times, and five other people were killed, in Montes Claros during campaigning for the nationwide March 1 general election. Melo Viana would recover from his wounds and live until 1954.
- The Opium Commission of the League of Nations adopted a global resolution that only enough opium would be produced as was necessary for medicinal purposes.
- Born: David Kahn, American historian, journalist and writer, known for the history of cryptography, The Codebreakers - The Story of Secret Writing; in New York City (d. 2024)

== Saturday, February 8, 1930 ==
- Pope Pius XI published a letter in L'Osservatore Romano condemning the persecution of Christians in the Soviet Union.
- Born: Alejandro Rey, Argentine-born U.S. film and TV actor and television director, in Buenos Aires (died of lung cancer, 1987)

== Sunday, February 9, 1930 ==
- A riot broke out at Vincennes race track in Paris when an angry crowd stormed the track and began tearing it down, believing that certain races were being fixed.
- Enrique Olaya Herrera won the Colombian presidential election, defeating two other major candidates. and took office for a 4-year term on August 7.

== Monday, February 10, 1930 ==
- The Yên Bái mutiny occurred in French Indochina. The French crushed an uprising of Vietnamese soldiers against their officers.
- Born: Robert Wagner, American TV and film actor; in Detroit

== Tuesday, February 11, 1930 ==
- At the London Naval Conference, the United States and Britain proposed the abolition of submarines, but France and Japan resisted.
- Born: Mary Quant, fashion designer, in Blackheath, London, England; (d. 2023)

== Wednesday, February 12, 1930 ==
- At the Convocations of Canterbury and York, the Archbishop of Canterbury attacked the Soviet Union for "the imprisonment, the exile, the deliberate putting to death of prelates and parish priests, of monks and nuns, and of the humblest folk."
- Born: John Doyle, Irish hurler and politician, in Holycross, County Tipperary (died 2010)

== Thursday, February 13, 1930 ==
- Charles Evans Hughes was confirmed as Chief Justice by the Senate by a vote of 52 to 26. He would take office on February 24.
- The film The Green Goddess, a talking remake of the 1923 silent film of the same name and starring George Arliss, was released.

== Friday, February 14, 1930 ==
- The engagement of Edda Mussolini and Galeazzo Ciano was announced.
- The Vatican sent a note to bishops and clergy around the world instructing them to deny rites such as holy communion, baptism and confirmation to women dressed in immodest attire.
- Died: Sir Thomas Mackenzie, 75, Scottish-born politician who served as Prime Minister of New Zealand from March 28 to July 10, 1912. He later served as New Zealand's diplomatic representative, the High Commissioner, until 1920.

== Saturday, February 15, 1930 ==
- The Soviet newspapers Izvestia and Pravda declared that foreign attacks on the government for its suppression of churches were part of a concerted international movement against the USSR.
- Born: Bruce Bolt, Australian seismologist, in Largs, New South Wales (d. 2005)
- Died:
  - Giulio Douhet, 60, Italian general and air power theorist
  - William Stearns Davis, 52, American educator, historian and author, of pneumonia following an operation

== Sunday, February 16, 1930 ==
- Cairine Wilson was appointed to the Senate of Canada, the first female senator of the entire British Empire.

== Monday, February 17, 1930 ==
- André Tardieu resigned as Prime Minister of France after his government was defeated by six votes in the Chamber of Deputies. The defeat was over a minor bill involving the taxation of married women sharing a business with their husbands.
- Born: Ruth Rendell, English author, in South Woodford, Essex, as Ruth Barbara Grasemann (d. 2015)

== Tuesday, February 18, 1930 ==
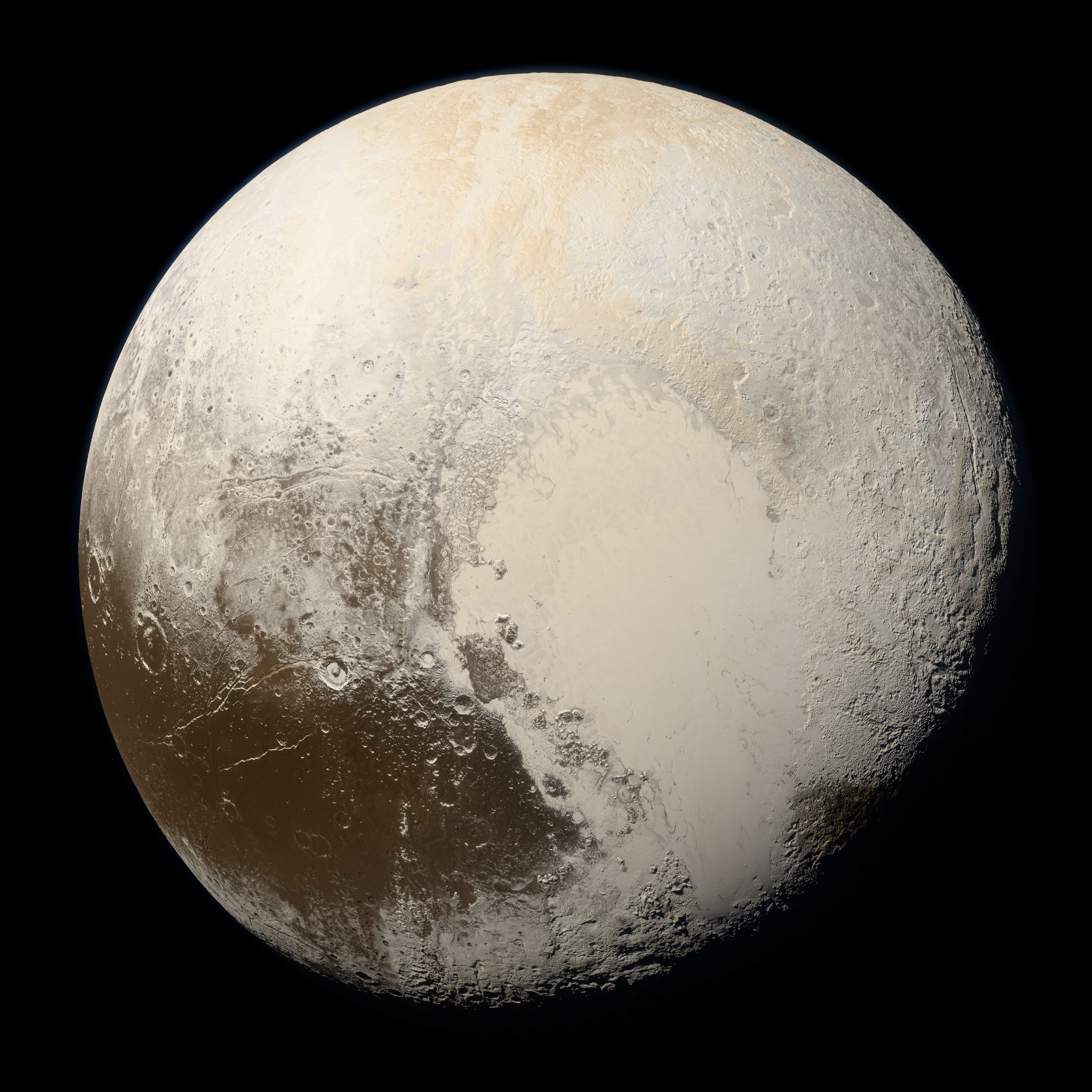
Pluto in 2015

- Astronomer Clyde Tombaugh discovered the ninth planet, Pluto. In 2006, the International Astronomical Union would reclassify the definition of planets and declare that Earth was one of only eight, rather than nine, planets in the Solar System.
- Representatives of the United States, Britain, Norway, the Netherlands and Brazil signed a pact in Nanjing bringing foreign lawyers under the jurisdiction and control of the Chinese government.
- The bodies of explorer Carl Ben Eielson and his mechanic, Earl Borland, were recovered from the site of their plane crash in Siberia. The plane went down on November 9 while trying to reach the stranded ship Nanuk.
- Elm Farm Ollie became the first cow to fly in an airplane, as part of the International Air Exposition in St. Louis, Missouri.
- Ho Chi Minh gave the speech "Appeal Made on the Occasion of the Founding of the Indochinese Communist Party" calling for a people's communist revolution.

== Wednesday, February 19, 1930 ==
- The London Naval Conference was adjourned for a week to give France time to form a new government.
- Born: John Frankenheimer, American film director, in Queens, New York (d. 2002)

== Thursday, February 20, 1930 ==
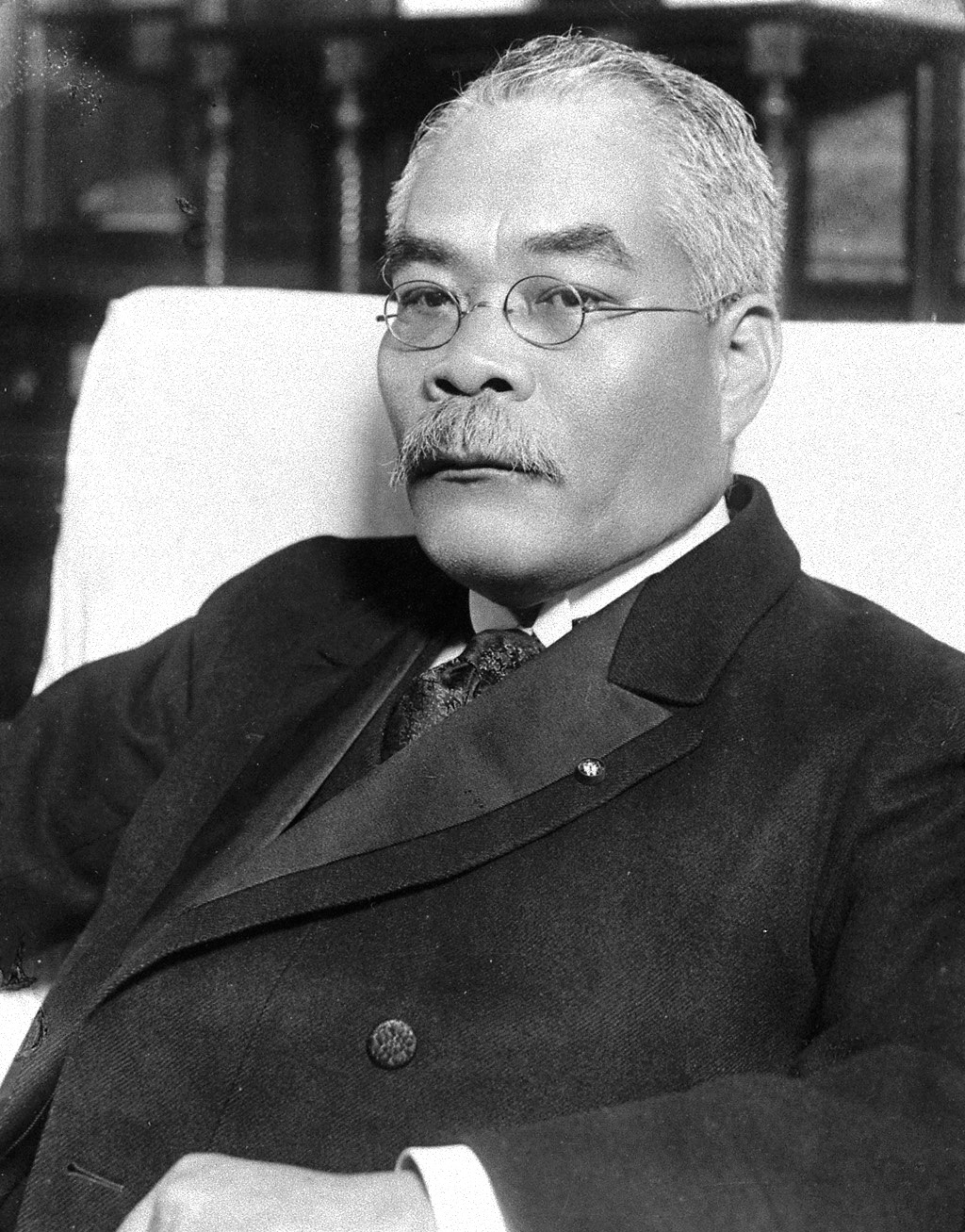
Prime Minister Hamaguchi

- Voting was held for the 466 seats of Japan's House of Representatives. The Constitutional Democratic Party (the Minseitō), led by Prime Minister Osachi Hamaguchi, won 273 of the seats for a majority. In the previous election, no party had the 234 seats necessary for control, with the Minseitō having 217 and the rival Seiyūkai having 218.

== Friday, February 21, 1930 ==
- Camille Chautemps became the new Prime Minister of France.
- Richard Luttrell Pilkington Bethell, the 3rd Baron Westbury, committed suicide by jumping from the seventh story window of his apartment. Believers in the supernatural attributed his death to the curse of Tutankhamun, as his son was an Egyptologist who had participated in the excavation of Tut's tomb and mysteriously died in his sleep in November 1929.
- Born: Joan Metge, New Zealand social anthropologist, educator, lecturer and writer; in Auckland (d. 2025)

== Saturday, February 22, 1930 ==
- Marking the fourteenth anniversary of the Battle of Verdun, a lighthouse was dedicated at the Douaumont Ossuary which would flash alternately a red and white light over the cemetery grounds.
- Born: Marni Nixon, American soprano and playback singer who dubbed the singing for other actresses in film; in Altadena, California (d. 2016)

== Sunday, February 23, 1930 ==
- Sir Edwin Lutyens resigned from the Royal Institute of British Architects after endorsing an unpopular government plan to build a bridge across the Thames at Charing Cross.
- Died:
  - Mabel Normand, 37, American film actress, of tuberculosis
  - Horst Wessel, 22, German Nazi Party activist, 40 days after being shot on January 14, celebrated as a martyr by the Nazis.

== Monday, February 24, 1930 ==
- While lying in his hospital bed, Chicago gangster Frank McErlane was shot three times by rival gang members. McErlane, whose fractured right leg was in a cast while recovering from a previous shootout, returned fire and the two assailants fled.
- Canadian Prime Minister William Lyon Mackenzie King said that he would immediately call a new federal election on the issue of the American tariff if the U.S. government boosted its tariff against Canada.
- The U.S. Supreme Court decided United States v. Wurzbach.
- Born: Anita Steckel, US artist and feminist, in Brooklyn, New York (d. 2012)

== Tuesday, February 25, 1930 ==
- The Camille Chautemps government fell on a confidence vote after less than a week in power. He had tried to form a left-wing coalition but the Socialist Party refused to support him when he vowed to continue the naval policy of the previous government at the London Conference instead of adopting a more conciliatory one.
- The British bill to abolish blasphemy as a crime was dropped.

== Wednesday, February 26, 1930 ==
- President of the Dominican Republic Horacio Vásquez fled Santo Domingo as rebel forces led by General Rafael Trujillo toppled his government.
- André Tardieu was asked by French President Gaston Doumergue to try to form a new government.

== Thursday, February 27, 1930 ==
- Prayers for former U.S. president William Howard Taft were broadcast across the nation as physicians frankly stated that he had been unconscious for most of the day and that there was no hope of recovery.
- The Fox Theatre in Visalia, California, opened.
- Born: Joanne Woodward, US actress and producer, in Thomasville, Georgia

== Friday, February 28, 1930 ==
- Spain restored censorship of the press and imposed a ban on all public meetings and speeches in an attempt to suppress republican agitation.
- Born: Leon Cooper, American physicist and Nobel Prize laureate, in New York City (d. 2024)
- Died: Perceval Maitland Laurence, 75, English scholar and judge
