= January 1930 =

Month of 1930

<<	January 1930					>>
Su	Mo	Tu	We	Th	Fr	Sa
			1	2	3	4
5	6	7	8	9	10	11
12	13	14	15	16	17	18
19	20	21	22	23	24	25
26	27	28	29	30	31

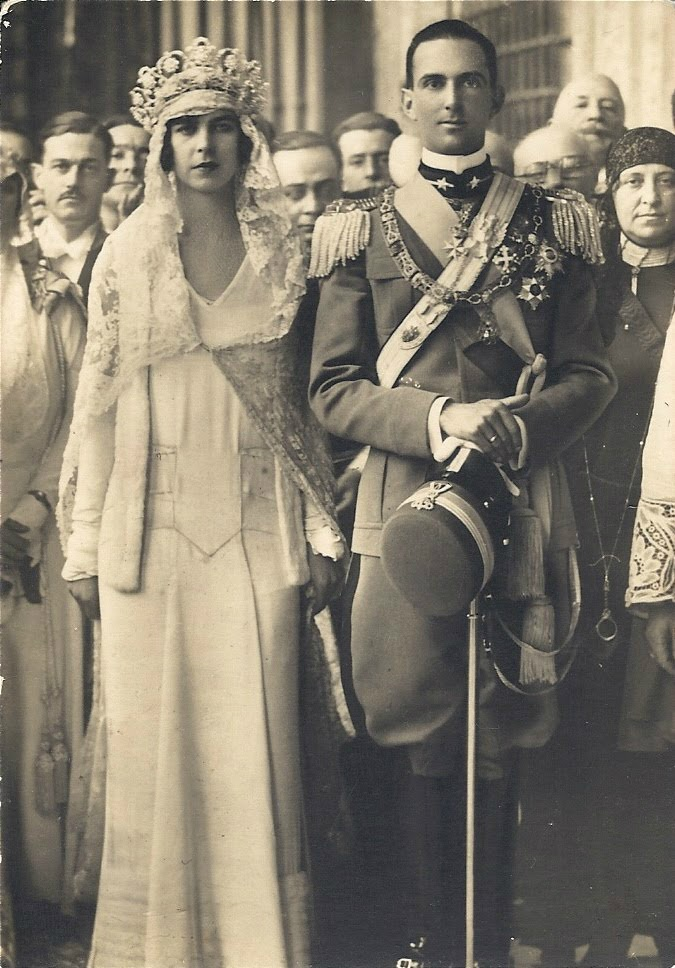
January 8, 1930: Italy's Crown Prince Umberto weds Princess Marie José of Belgium

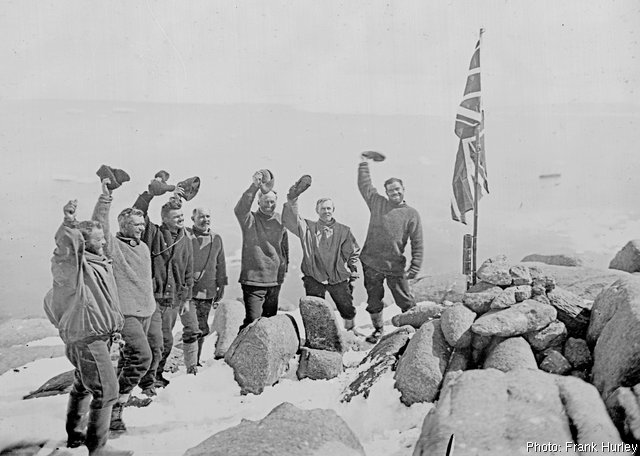
January 13, 1930: Sir Douglas Mawson and British and New Zealand team find new territory and proclaim an island "Proclamation Island" on behalf of the British Crown

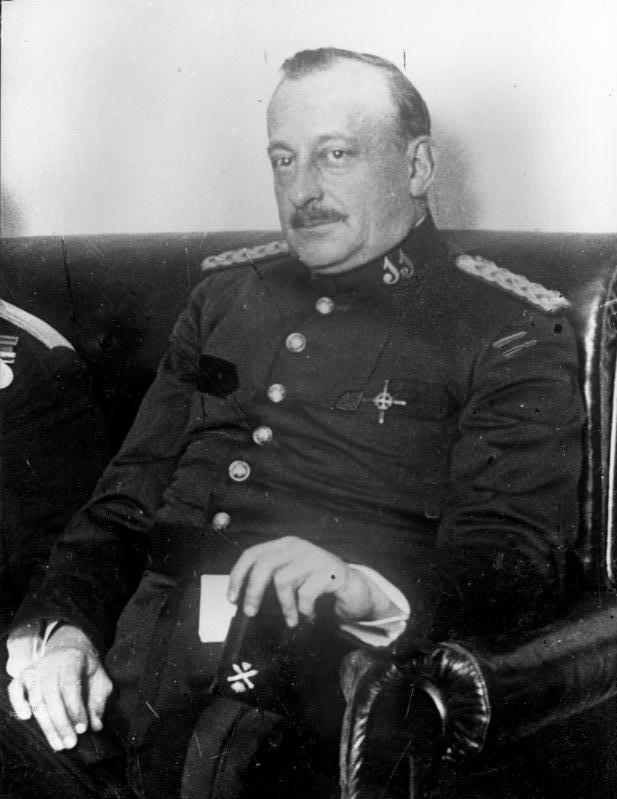
January 28, 1930: Spain's dictator Primo de Rivera forced out

The following events occurred in January 1930:

== Wednesday, January 1, 1930 ==
- The USC Trojans defeated the previously unbeaten Pittsburgh Panthers, 47 to 14, in the 16th Rose Bowl Game. The NCAA recognizes both Pitt and unbeaten Notre Dame (which had defeated USC in the regular season) as champions of the 1929 college football season.
- Born: Gaafar Nimeiry, President of Sudan from 1969 to 1985; in Omdurman (d. 2009)

== Thursday, January 2, 1930 ==
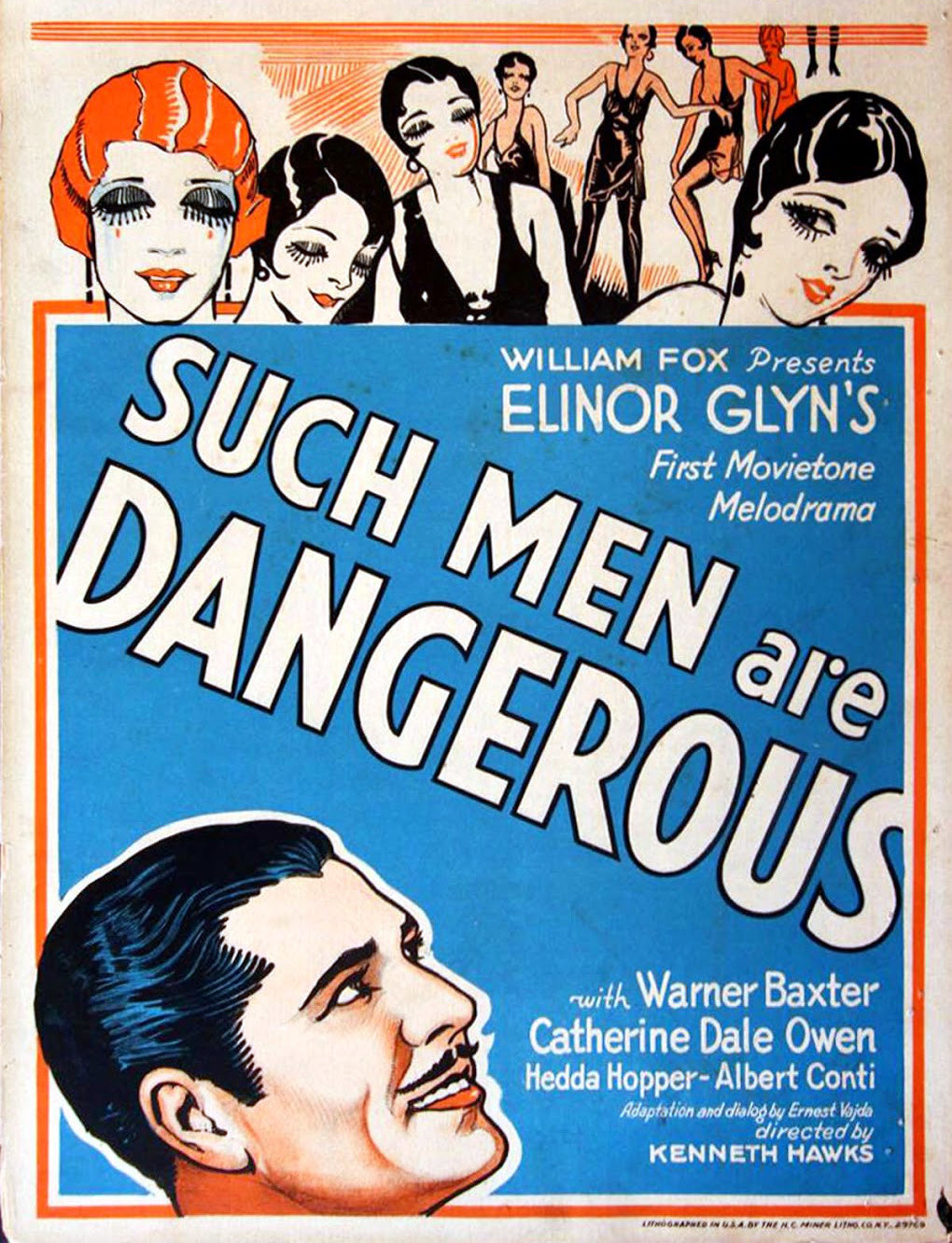
The final Kenneth Hawks film

- A mid-air collision killed film director Kenneth Hawks, cinematographer Conrad Wells, and eight other crew of the Fox Film Corporation while the two airplanes were filming an action scene for the movie Such Men Are Dangerous.
- King Victor Emmanuel III granted amnesty to over 400,000 Italians covering various minor offenses. The act of leniency was a gift ahead of the wedding of Crown Prince Umberto to Marie José of Belgium.
- The Indian National Congress continued in Lahore as Mahatma Gandhi introduced a resolution condemning the assassination attempt of the previous month of Viceroy of India Lord Irwin. The motion carried on a show of hands despite cries of indignation.
- Born: Julius La Rosa, American singer known for being fired on live TV from The Arthur Godfrey Show; in Brooklyn (d. 2016)

== Friday, January 3, 1930 ==
- A fire broke out in the United States Capitol in a storage room, which firefighters extinguished in about 45 minutes. Some paintings and documents were damaged by smoke and water but there was no structural damage of consequence.
- The second International Conference on Reparations began at the Hague and continued for 17 days.
- The musical comedy film No, No, Nanette was premiered.
- Born:
  - Robert Loggia, American film actor; in Staten Island, New York (d. 2015)
  - Barbara Stuart, American actress and wife of actor Dick Gautier; in Paris, Illinois (d. 2011)

== Saturday, January 4, 1930 ==
- The National Automobile Show opened at the Grand Central Palace in New York City. The Cadillac V-16 was introduced at this show.
- The French cruiser Edgar Quinet ran aground off the coast of Algeria and proved to be a total loss.
- Born: Don McMahon, American baseball relief pitcher; in Brooklyn (d. 1987)

== Sunday, January 5, 1930 ==
- The Soviet Politburo adopted a resolution calling for the completion of collectivization of farming in the U.S.S.R. that would ultimately dispossess the kulaks.

== Monday, January 6, 1930 ==
- Clessie Cummins, founder of Cummins, completed the first diesel engine automobile trip(from Indianapolis, Indiana, to New York City, United States).
- The Robert E. Sherwood play Waterloo Bridge premiered at the Fulton Theatre on Broadway, New York's theatre district.
- Australian cricketer Donald Bradman broke all first-class records by amassing 452 not out in a single innings batting for New South Wales against Queensland.
- Born: Professor Tanaka (stage name for Charles J. Kalani Jr.), American professional wrestler and actor; in Honolulu, Territory of Hawaii, as (d. 2000)

== Tuesday, January 7, 1930 ==
- Contract negotiations began between Babe Ruth and the New York Yankees. Owner Jacob Ruppert offered $75,000 per year for two years, a raise of $5,000 per year over the previous three seasons. Ruth rejected the offer and demanded $85,000 annually for three years, but Ruppert refused and negotiations broke off.

== Wednesday, January 8, 1930 ==
- Crown Prince Umberto of Italy married Princess Marie José of Belgium in the Pauline Chapel of the Quirinal Palace in Rome.

== Thursday, January 9, 1930 ==
- The Boston Bruins hockey team won their fourteenth straight game. This would stand as the record for the longest winning streak in NHL history until 1982 when the New York Islanders won fifteen straight.
- U.S. Senator Reed Smoot of Utah became the first public official to suggest that the Boulder Dam project be renamed to Hoover Dam in honor of U.S. President Herbert Hoover.
- Died: Edward Bok, 66, Dutch-American author

== Friday, January 10, 1930 ==
- The Ikhwan Revolt in Arabia ended with the surrender of the rebels to the British.
- The League of Nations observed its tenth anniversary. Officials at the organization marked the occasion by reviewing its year-by-year milestones.
- Born: Roy E. Disney, nephew of Walt Disney and senior executive of The Walt Disney Company, in Los Angeles (d. 2009)

== Saturday, January 11, 1930 ==
- Pope Pius XI issued a decree saying that education belonged first to the church, second to the family and third to the state. The pope condemned coed schools, explaining that "Nature ordained the two sexes for different functions in society, and, therefore, they require different education", and also warned that sex education would expose youth, "before the proper time, to opportunities for sin on the pretext of accustoming and hardening them against danger."
- Born: Rod Taylor, Australian-born film actor; in Lidcombe, New South Wales (d. 2015)

== Sunday, January 12, 1930 ==
- The British tug HMS St. Genny foundered in the English Channel off the coast of Ushant with the loss of 28 out of 33 crew.
- Born:
  - Tim Horton, Canadian ice hockey defenceman and co-founder of Tim Hortons coffeeshop chain, in Cochrane, Ontario, Canada (killed in auto accident, 1974)
  - Jennifer Johnston, Irish novelist, in Dublin (d. 2025)
  - Minoru Makihara, Japanese businessman, in London, UK (d. 2020)

== Monday, January 13, 1930 ==
- The British Australian New Zealand Antarctic Research Expedition (BANZARE), led by Sir Douglas Mawson, became the first group of people to set foot on previously unexplored territory in Antarctica, landing on a small isle that they claimed on behalf of the British Crown and named Proclamation Island. From there, they discovered Amundsen Bay and the Tula Mountains the next day.
- A newspaper comic strip adaptation of the Disney character Mickey Mouse first appeared.

== Tuesday, January 14, 1930 ==
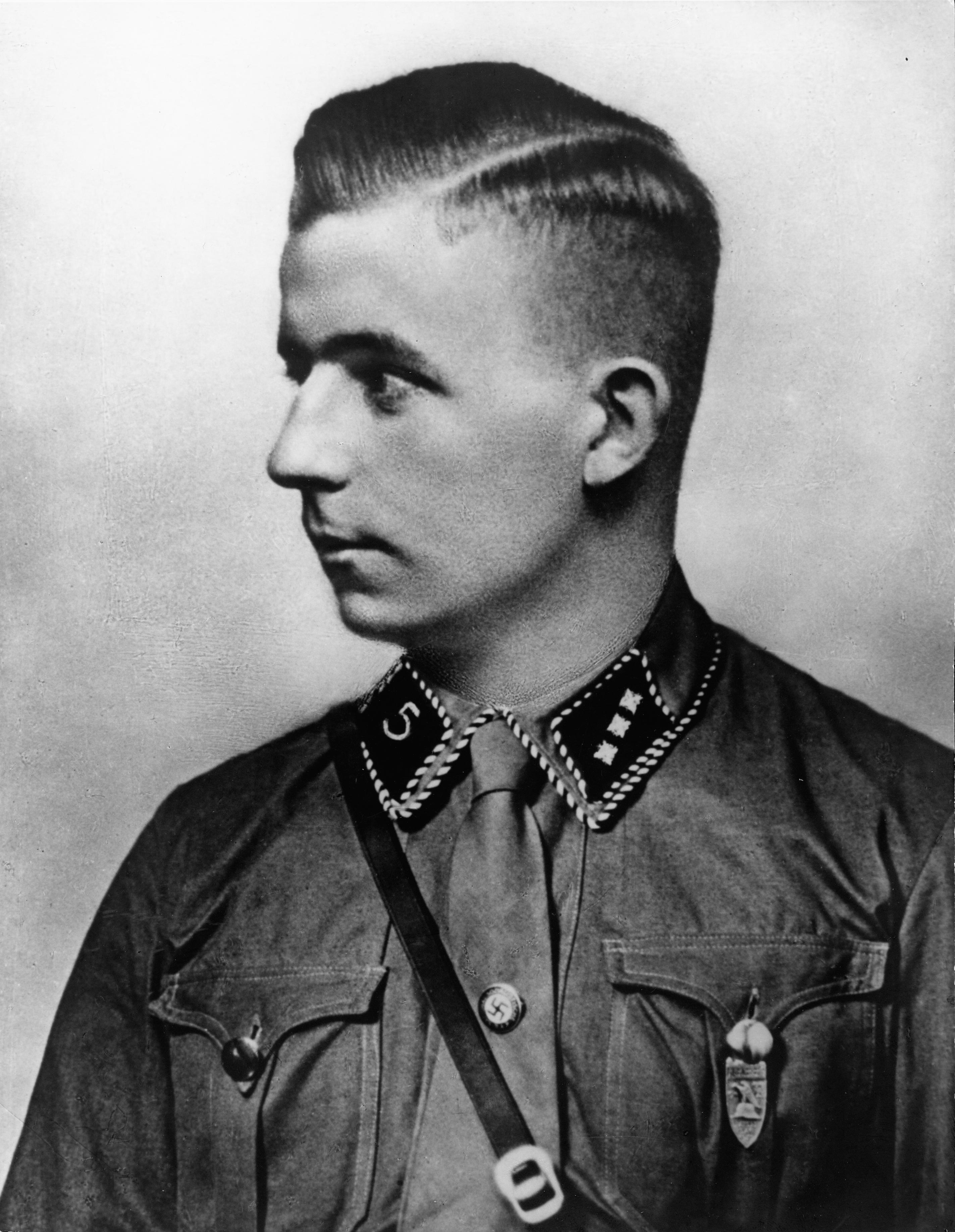
Horst Wessel

- Nazi paramilitary officer Horst Wessel was shot and fatally wounded by a German Communist in a raid on his apartment. He would die of his injuries on February 23 and become a martyr of the Nazi movement.
- The Moon made its closest approach to Earth in the 20th century (and the closest for the next 327 years) with perigee coming within 356,397 kilometres (221,455 mi) of Earth. The next time the moon comes this close to earth will be January 1, 2257, when its perigee is 356,371 kilometres (221,439 mi).

== Wednesday, January 15, 1930 ==
- Five communists died in clashes with police around Germany during demonstrations on the anniversary of the death of Rosa Luxemburg and Karl Liebknecht.
- The Moon moved into its nearest point to Earth, called the perigee, at the same time as the fullest phase of its cycle. It was the closest moon distance at 356,397 km (221,455 mi) in recent history, and will not be equalled until 2257.

== Thursday, January 16, 1930 ==
- Work on legislation such as the Smoot-Hawley Tariff Bill wound up being suspended as lengthy speeches about the Volstead Act were made all day long in the U.S. House of Representatives and Senate on the tenth anniversary of its coming into force.

== Friday, January 17, 1930 ==
- Europe's most powerful radio broadcasting station was inaugurated at Santa Palomba tor del Vesconzo, near Rome.
- The Lionel Barrymore-directed musical film The Rogue Song premiered at Grauman's Chinese Theatre in Hollywood.

== Saturday, January 18, 1930 ==
- The German city of Cologne signed an agreement with Ford Motor Company to build a large automobile factory in the area.
- The Harvard Economic Society issued a statement declaring that "There are indications that the severest phase of the recession is over."

== Sunday, January 19, 1930 ==
- The Watsonville Riots broke out in Watsonville, California, United States as a series of attacks on Filipino American farm workers by White and Hispanic residents, starting with a fight outside a Filipino dance club. After the violence ended on January 23, legal restrictions on Filipino immigration would be enacted.
- Maddux Air Lines Flight 7, a Ford Tri-Motor airliner en route from Mexico to Los Angeles crashed in Oceanside, California, when its left wing struck a hill while flying at low altitude due to bad weather conditions. All 16 passengers and crew were killed.
- Born: Tippi Hedren (Nathalie Kay Hedren), American film actress known for The Birds, fashion model and animal rights activist, in New Ulm, Minnesota

== Monday, January 20, 1930 ==
- The second reparations conference at The Hague ended as nineteen nations signed a revised Young Plan.
- Born: Edwin "Buzz" Aldrin, American astronaut and the second man to walk on the Moon; in Glen Ridge, New Jersey

== Tuesday, January 21, 1930 ==
- The Five Power Naval Disarmament Conference opened in London, UK. Great Britain, the United States, Japan, France and Italy sought to revise and extend the terms of the Washington Naval Treaty of 1922.

== Wednesday, January 22, 1930 ==
- Old imperial fortifications near Kehl in Germany were blown up. Until recently they had been occupied by the French, but it was agreed at the second Hague conference that the French would evacuate the forts and the Germans would raze them afterward.

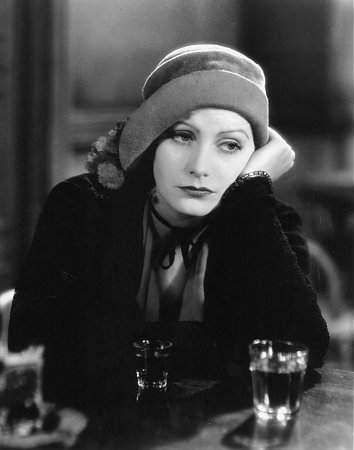
Garbo

- The drama film Anna Christie, starring Greta Garbo in the title role, premiered at the Criterion Theatre in Los Angeles. This film was Garbo's first speaking role and was marketed with the famous tagline, "Garbo Talks!"
- Born: Mariví Bilbao spanish TV actress (d. 2013)
- Died: Reginald Brett, 2nd Viscount Esher, 77, British politician

== Thursday, January 23, 1930 ==
- The government of Mexico announced it was breaking off diplomatic relations with the Soviet Union. "The Mexican government has the full right to refuse to allow foreign elements to mix in its politics and to object to these foreigners making Mexico the theater of their machinations and intrigues against Mexicans, and we are determined to protect ourselves from them", Foreign Minister Genaro Estrada stated.

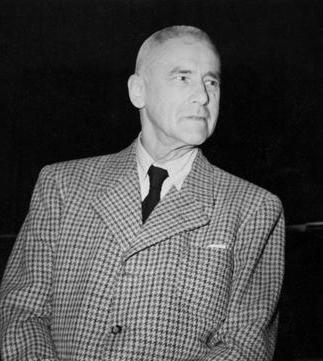
Frick

- Wilhelm Frick became the first Nazi to hold a cabinet post in Germany when he was appointed Minister of Internal Affairs and Public Education in Thuringia.
- The George Washington Birthplace National Monument was established in Westmoreland County, Virginia, near Colonial Beach.
- Born: Sir Derek Walcott, Saint Lucian poet, 1992 Nobel Prize in Literature laureate; in Castries (d. 2017)

== Friday, January 24, 1930 ==
- British financier Clarence Hatry was sentenced to 14 years in prison after pleading guilty to forgery and fraud.
- The British House of Commons passed the second reading of a bill, sponsored by Ernest Thurtle, decriminalizing blasphemy and atheism.
- The U.S. Senate scrapped a proposed tariff on shoes which would have cost Americans $100 million a year.

== Saturday, January 25, 1930 ==
- Thirteen young Bengalis were arrested in Kolkata for possessing bombmaking materials, daggers and seditious literature.
- The Brazilian soccer football team São Paulo FC, winner of the 2005 FIFA Club World Cup, two Intercontinental Cups and six Brazilian championships was founded.
- The Luigi Pirandello tragicomedy play Tonight We Improvise premiered in Königsberg, Germany (now Kaliningrad, Russia).

== Sunday, January 26, 1930 ==
- A mock "Independence Day" was observed in India on the opening day of a civil disobedience campaign. British police were out in full force as rioting was expected, but apart from one incident in which communist mill workers disrupted a gathering in Mumbai the day was peaceful.
- Direct wireless service was inaugurated between Great Britain and Japan.

== Monday, January 27, 1930 ==
- Film actress María Corda filed for divorce from her producer-director husband Alexander Korda.
- Born: Bobby "Blue" Bland, African-American rhythm and blues singer, Grammy award winner and inductee in the Rock and Roll Hall of Fame; as Robert Calvin Brooks in Barretville, Tennessee (d. 2013)
- Died: Japanese Imperial Navy Admiral Dewa Shigetō, 73

== Tuesday, January 28, 1930 ==
- Miguel Primo de Rivera, who had exercised dictatorial rule over Spain as Prime Minister since 1923, was forced to resign after losing the support of the Spanish Army or of King Alfonso XIII. With his health deteriorating and having alienated his supporters, Primo de Rivera handed in his resignation at 8:50 in the evening. Going into exile in France, he died six weeks later from complications of diabetes.
- The first patent for a field-effect transistor was granted, to Julius Edgar Lilienfeld, in the United States.
- Died: Emmy Destinn, 51, Czech operatic soprano, following a stroke

== Wednesday, January 29, 1930 ==
- Filipinos were banned from boxing in the US state of California as a precaution against race riots in the event of a controversial decision between a Filipino boxer and a white opponent.
- Died: Archduchess Elisabeth Franziska of Austria, 38 (pneumonia)

== Thursday, January 30, 1930 ==
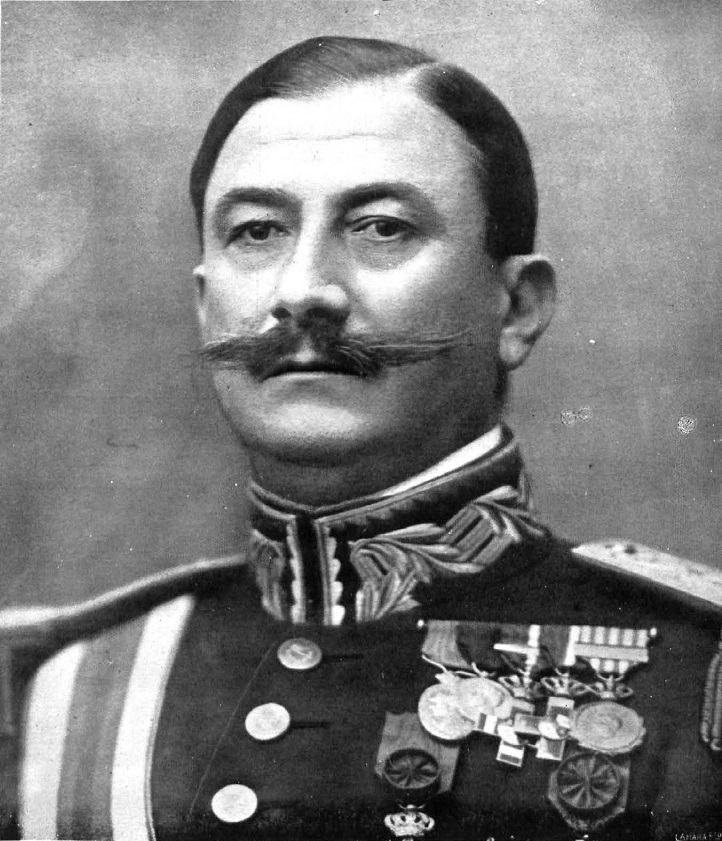
General Berenguer

- General Dámaso Berenguer took over as Prime Minister of Spain.
- Thirteen miners were killed and 6 injured in a coal mine explosion in Turkey.
- A radiosonde was launched by Pavel Molchanov from Slutsk in the Soviet Union.
- Born: Gene Hackman, American film actor, winner of two Academy Awards; in San Bernardino, California (d. 2025)

== Friday, January 31, 1930 ==
- Communists and police exchanged gunfire in Hamburg when 3,000 marched through the streets agitating for a general strike. 76 communists were arrested in Berlin for plotting to stage a riot.
