= December 1929 =

Month of 1929

<<	December 1929					>>
Su	Mo	Tu	We	Th	Fr	Sa
1	2	3	4	5	6	7
8	9	10	11	12	13	14
15	16	17	18	19	20	21
22	23	24	25	26	27	28
29	30	31

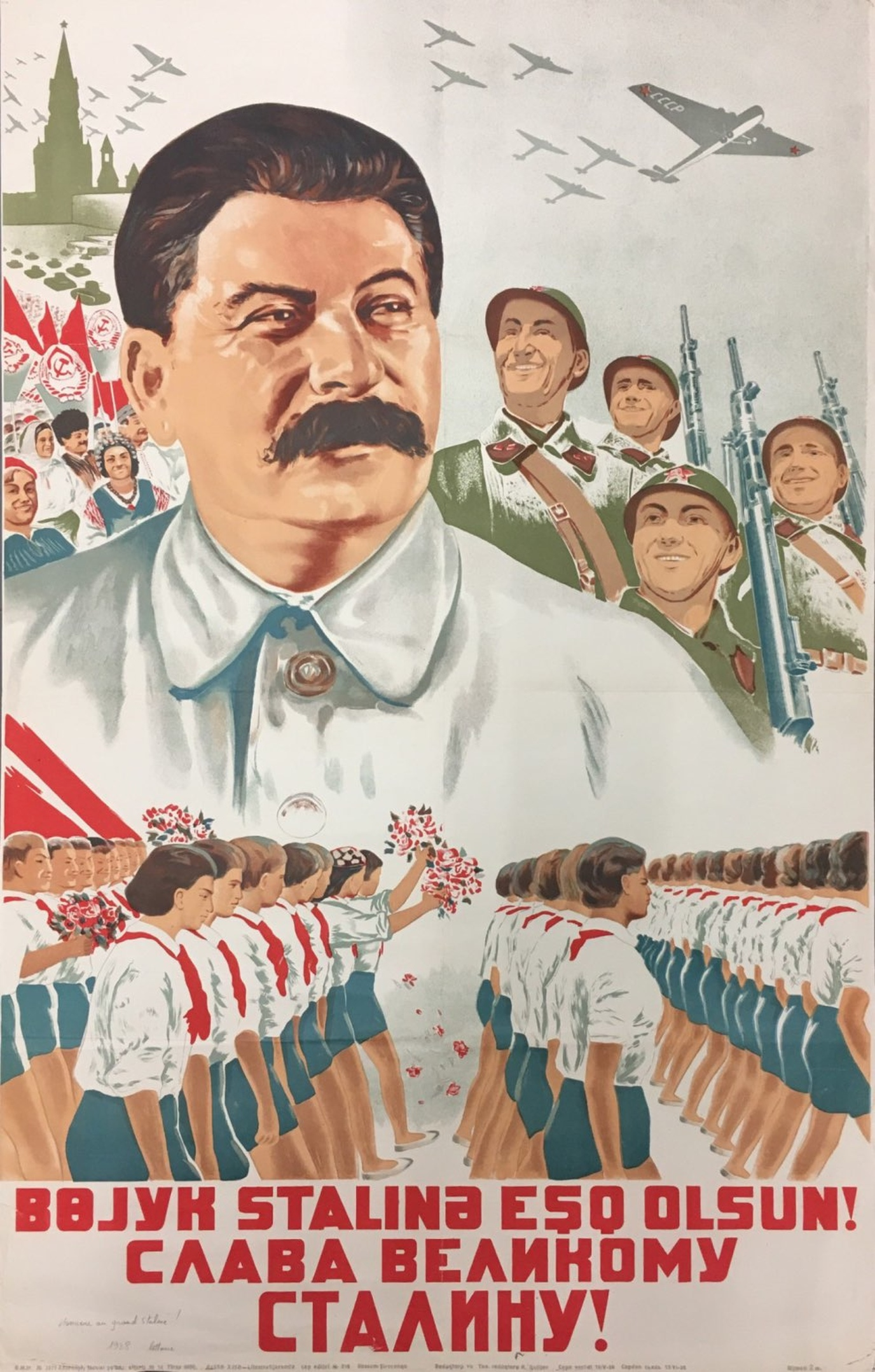
December 21, 1929: Personality cult of Joseph Stalin booms on his 50th birthday (shown, a 1938 example)

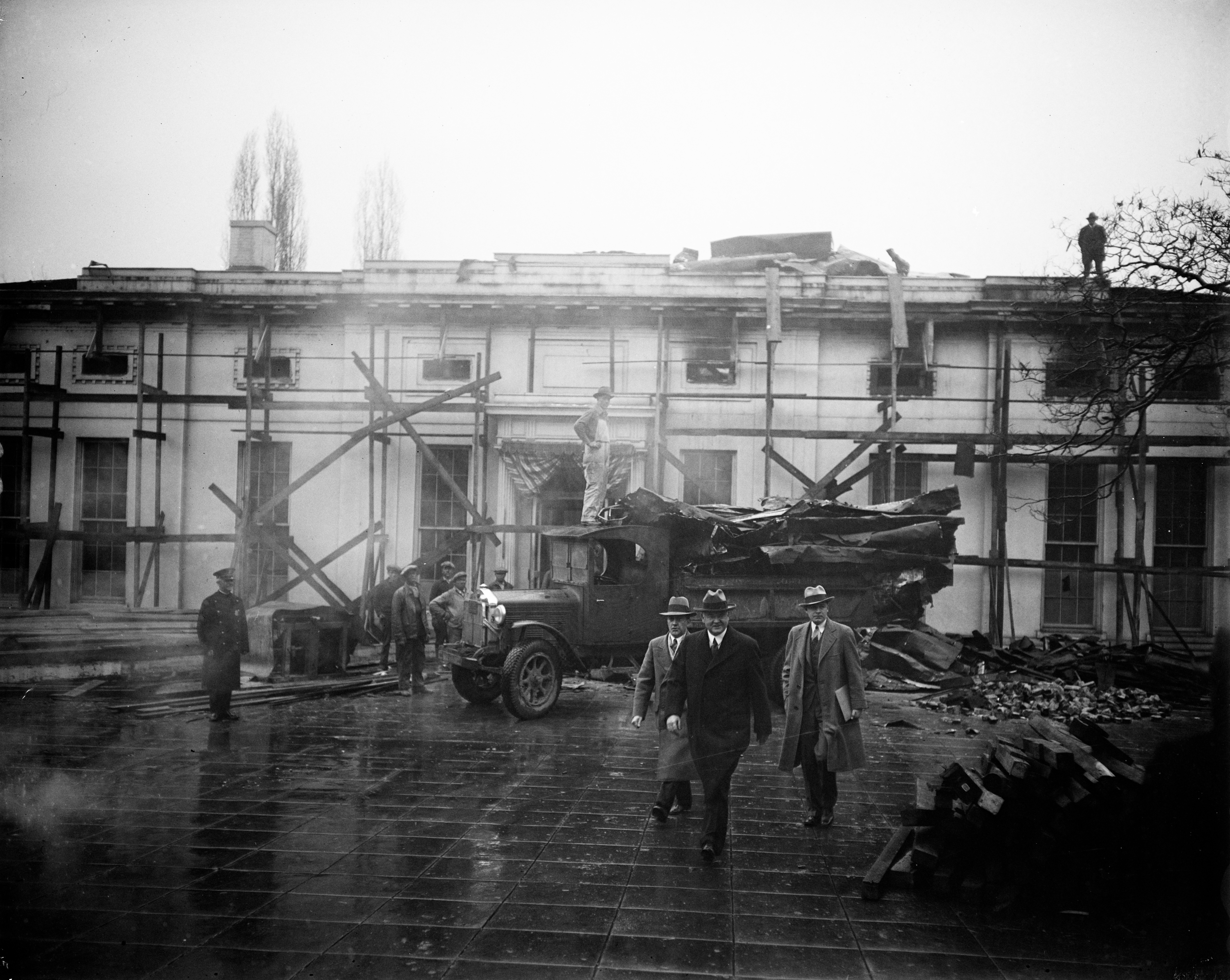
December 24, 1929: Electrical fire destroys the West Wing of the White House, rebuilding planned

The following events occurred in December 1929:

== Sunday, December 1, 1929 ==
- Seven people were killed in a coal mine explosion in West Frankfort, Illinois.

== Monday, December 2, 1929 ==
- U.S. President Herbert Hoover called on the Soviet Union and China to end armed hostilities and resolve the Chinese Eastern Railway dispute by peaceful means. Simultaneously, Secretary of State Henry L. Stimson asked all the other signatories of the Kellogg–Briand Pact to join the United States in urging the two warring countries to refrain from further fighting.

== Tuesday, December 3, 1929 ==
- President Hoover delivered his first State of the Union message to Congress. It was presented in the form of a written message rather than a speech. The message asserted that "during the past year the Nation has continued to grow in strength" and that the country's problems were "problems of growth and of progress." Of the economic situation, Hoover stated that he had "instituted systematic, voluntary methods of cooperation with the business institutions and with State and municipal authorities to make certain that fundamental businesses of the country shall continue as usual, that wages and therefore consuming power shall not be reduced, and that a special effort shall be made to expand construction work in order to assist in equalizing other deficits in employment ... I am convinced that through these measures we have reestablished confidence."

== Wednesday, December 4, 1929 ==
- Former Prime Minister David Lloyd George, at 66 the eldest member of the British House of Commons, told his colleagues that a second world war was inevitable without disarmament. "The League of Nations has been going on for ten years", he said. "There have been meetings and eloquent speeches delivered in favour of peace, disarmament and arbitration, but the League of Nations is in danger of failure from being run by flapdoodlers."
- The House of Lords voted, 43 to 21, against resuming diplomatic relations with the Soviet Union.

== Thursday, December 5, 1929 ==
- King Victor Emmanuel III and Queen Elena visited Vatican City to meet with the Pope, the first time the sovereign of unified Italy had ever entered the Vatican. Thousands watched the royal motorcade procession through Rome.
- The Tajik Soviet Socialist Republic was established.
- The American League for Physical Culture, the first American nudist organization, was formed in New York City.

== Friday, December 6, 1929 ==
- The Chinese city of Nanjing came under martial law as 30,000 rebel forces marched on the city during the Civil War.
- Women received the right to vote in Turkey.

== Saturday, December 7, 1929 ==
- The Aga Khan, Imam of the Nizari Isma'ilism sect of Islam and one of the world's wealthiest men, was married in Aix-les-Bains, France to a former candy store clerk and dressmaker in a simple ceremony with no guests.

== Sunday, December 8, 1929 ==
- The Nazi Party received 11.3% of the vote in local elections in Thuringia, a marked increase over the 2.6 percent the party received in the national elections in May 1928.
- Died: José Vicente Concha, 62, President of Colombia from 1914 to 1918

== Monday, December 9, 1929 ==
- Jay Pierrepont Moffat, the U.S. chargé d'affaires in Geneva, signed the protocol of adherence to the World Court. The action was not permanent until the U.S. Senate approved.
- Born: Bob Hawke, Prime Minister of Australia from 1983 to 1991; in Bordertown, South Australia (d. 2019)
- Died: E. T. Kingsley, 73, founder of the Socialist Party of Canada

== Tuesday, December 10, 1929 ==
- The 1929 Nobel Prizes were awarded. The recipients were Louis de Broglie of France for Physics, Arthur Harden of the United Kingdom and Hans von Euler-Chelpin of Sweden (Chemistry), Christiaan Eijkman and Sir Frederick Gowland Hopkins of the United Kingdom (Physiology or Medicine), Thomas Mann of Germany (Literature) and Frank Billings Kellogg of the United States (Peace).
- A fire at the Pathé film studio in New York killed 11 people during the filming of a musical revue, The Black and White Revue after a hot lamp set a velvet curtain ablaze on the movie set. The studio had no sprinklers. The tragedy led to stricter enforcement of New York's fire regulations.
- Seventeen passengers were killed and 60 injured in a train accident near Namur in Belgium.
- Pavlos Kountouriotis, the President of Greece since the founding of the Second Hellenic Republic in 1926, resigned for reasons of health. He was succeeded by former Prime Minister Alexandros Zaimis.
- Died: Harry Crosby, 31, wealthy American poet and publisher, was found with a gun in his hand and a single gunshot wound to the head, lying next to the body of his 21-year-old lover Josephine Rotch, who had a single wound to the head from a different pistol, in what appeared to have been a suicide pact.

== Wednesday, December 11, 1929 ==
- A prison riot broke out at Auburn Prison in upstate New York, apparently after a gun had been smuggled into the cell block. Eight convicts and a prison superintendent keeper were killed.
- The Reichstag adopted a bill requiring shops to close on Christmas Eve at 5 p.m.

== Thursday, December 12, 1929 ==
- The last British troops occupying the Rhineland were evacuated from Wiesbaden.
- The trial of 26 women in the Angel Makers of Nagyrév case opened in Szolnok, Hungary. The defendants were tried in batches with the final trial ending in the summer of 1930. Ultimately, eight were sentenced to death.

== Friday, December 13, 1929 ==
- A special public buildings subcommittee of the U.S. House of Representatives approved a $9.74 million plan to erect a building for the Supreme Court. The Court had been housed in offices in the United States Capitol building since that edifice was constructed.
- Born: Christopher Plummer, Canadian stage and film actor; in Toronto (d. 2021)

== Saturday, December 14, 1929 ==
- The Greek parliament elected Alexandros Zaimis as the new President of Greece.
- Fifty Communist Party of the U.S. members were arrested for staging an anti-administration protest in front of the White House without a permit, but they were released, almost immediately, in compliance with a request from President Hoover. White House Press Secretary George E. Akerson issued a statement saying that the President Hoover did "not believe that any such discourtesy in any way endangers the republic and that a night in jail is only doing them a favor of cheap martyrdom."
- Died: Royal Navy Admiral of the Fleet Sir Henry Jackson, 74. Jackson had been the First Sea Lord during World War One until being replaced after German warships were sighted in the English Channel in 1916.

== Sunday, December 15, 1929 ==
- Pope Pius XI beatified 107 English and Welsh martyrs who had been hanged between 1541 and 1680 during the English Reformation, along with 29 others who had been executed. The additions brought the list of beatified martyrs to 186. In 1935, two of the martyrs— Sir Thomas More and Cardinal John Fisher— would be canonized as saints of the Roman Catholic Church by Pope Pius on the 400th anniversary of their deaths.
- Born: Ray Herbert, baseball player, in Detroit (d. 2022)

== Monday, December 16, 1929 ==
- Pope Pius XI created six new Roman Catholic Cardinals, including the Vatican's Apostolic Nuncio to Germany, Eugenio Pacelli. In 1939, Pacelli would become the successor of Pius XI and take name Pope Pius XII.
- President Hoover signed a $160 million income tax reduction bill into law.

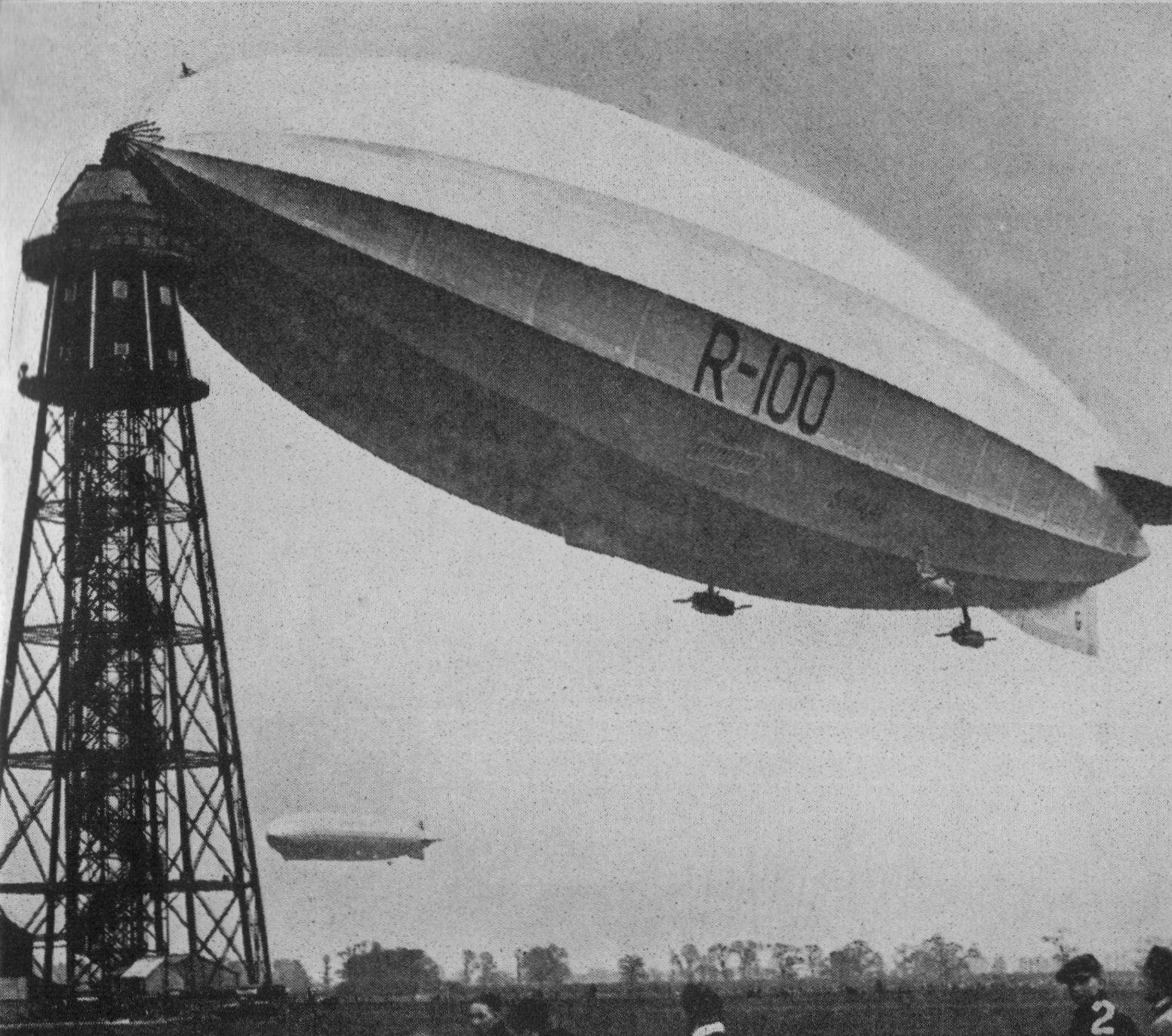
R100 in 1938

- The British airship R100 carried out its first flight.
- Born: Nicholas Courtney, English actor, in Cairo (d. 2011)

== Tuesday, December 17, 1929 ==
- An explosion killed 61 miners at the Old Town coal mine in McAlester, Oklahoma.
- Turkey and the Soviet Union signed a new treaty of alliance.
- Born: William Safire, journalist and writer; in New York City (d. 2009)

== Wednesday, December 18, 1929 ==
- The cruise ship RMS Fort Victoria was hit by the ocean liner SS Algonquin while sailing in a dense fog in the Ambrose Channel between the U.S. states of New York and New Jersey. All on board the Fort Victoria were rescued before the ship sank, and the Algonquin survived the collision.

== Thursday, December 19, 1929 ==
- The Austrian government set limitations on the freedom of the press by penalizing offenses against the military.

== Friday, December 20, 1929 ==
- With no advance public announcement, Pope Pius XI left the Vatican, entered Italian territory and celebrated mass at the Archbasilica of St. John Lateran. It was the first time since the unification of Italy in 1870 that a pope had left the Vatican and entered foreign territory.
- Born: Milan Panić, Serbian politician and pharmaceutical entrepreneur, 1st Prime Minister of FR Yugoslavia, founder of ICN Pharmaceuticals, in Belgrade, Kingdom of Yugoslavia (d. 2026)
- Died: Émile Loubet, 90, President of France from 1899 to 1906

== Saturday, December 21, 1929 ==
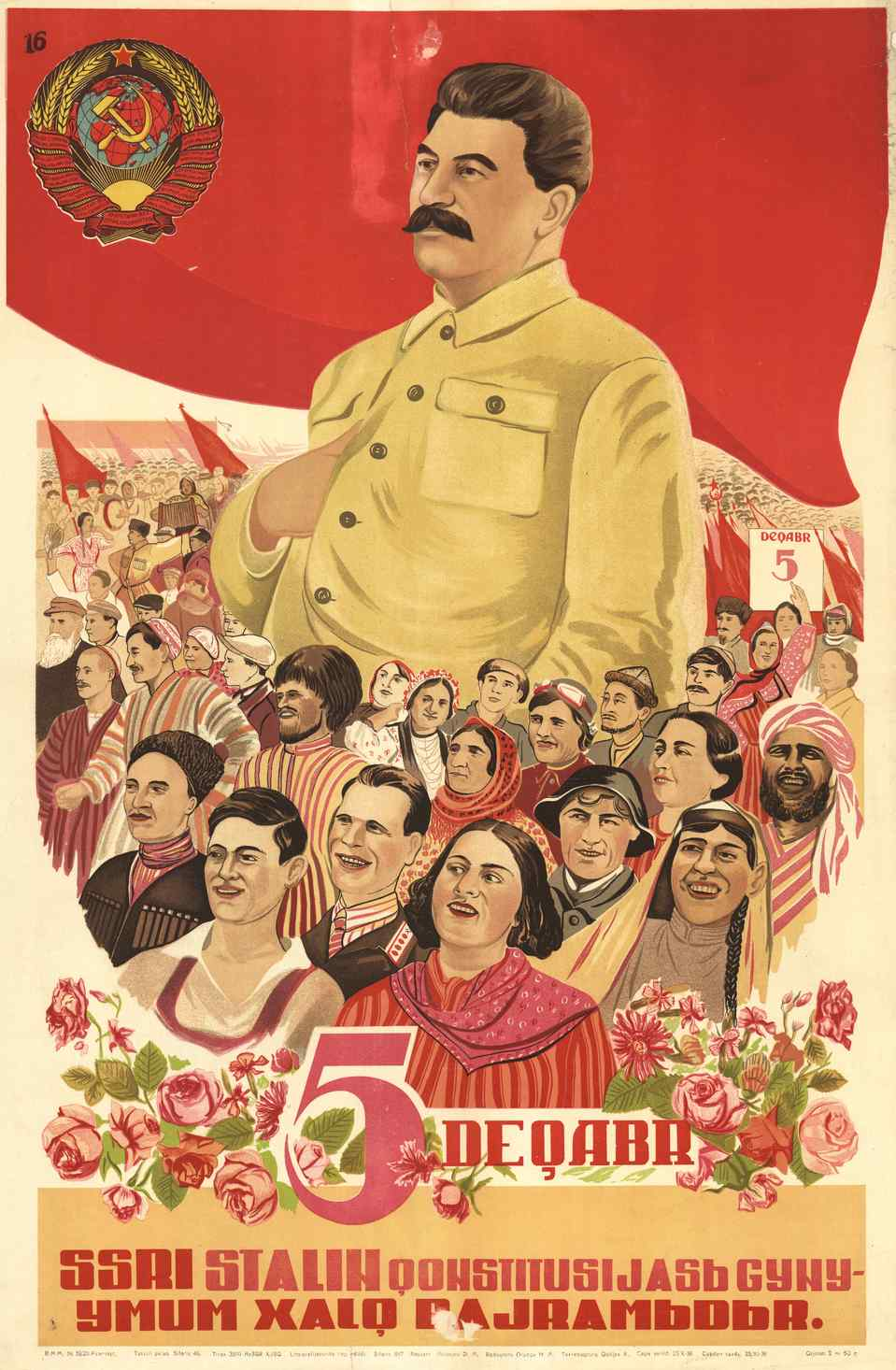
Another example of the Stalin cult, from 1938

- The occasion of Joseph Stalin's fiftieth birthday marked the beginning of the state-orchestrated cult of personality around him. An enormous press campaign showered hyperbolic acclaim on the "glorious leader", and that day's issue of Pravda was exclusively devoted to him. The city of Volgograd had been renamed in his honor in 1925, but the personality cult would see the erection of statues and other monuments in Stalin's honor until a few years after his 1953 death.
- The Indian National Congress opened a conference in Lahore.
- Parliamentary elections were held in Egypt. The Wafd Party won 198 of the 236 seats in the Chamber of Deputies, after all other parties boycotted the election. Thirty-eight of the seats were won by independent candidates.
- The musical film Pointed Heels, starring William Powell and Helen Kane, was released.

== Sunday, December 22, 1929 ==
- The German referendum on whether to reject, further payment of Germany's reparations owed under the Treaty of Versailles, failed as expected. Although over 90% of the votes cast approved the measure, only about 13.5% of the eligible voting population had participated at all, and the referendum needed a turnout of at least 50% in order to be accepted.
- The musical film Devil-May-Care, starring Ramon Novarro, premiered at the Astor Theatre in New York City.

== Monday, December 23, 1929 ==
- The Conflict between the Soviet Union and China ended with the signing of a protocol restoring the status quo on the Chinese Eastern Railway.
- At a railway station in Delhi, the Viceroy of India, Lord Irwin, survived an attempt on his life when a bomb was thrown through the window of a train he was riding in. An attendant was hurt but Lord Irwin escaped injury.
- An investigative committee in India submitted a report to the British government urging full Dominion status for India.
- The film Sally, based on the Broadway stage musical of the same name, premiered at the Winter Garden Theatre in New York City.
- Born: Chet Baker, jazz musician, in Yale, Oklahoma (d. 1988)

== Tuesday, December 24, 1929 ==
- The West Wing of the White House was seriously damaged in an evening fire. President Hoover left a Christmas Eve reception for children in order to direct efforts to retrieve important documents, but not all records could be saved. It was the most serious fire at the White House since it was burned by the British in 1814. Congress would authorize the construction of a new West Wing to replace the burned building.
- Three shots were fired at Argentine President Hipólito Yrigoyen as he left his home on the way to his office, but only his bodyguard was wounded. The assailant, a native Italian thought to be possibly an anarchist, was wounded when police guards returned fire. Efforts were made to save the shooter so he could be brought to trial but he died of his wounds.
- The Ohio Supreme Court declined to review the James H. Snook murder case, so his execution was scheduled for January 31.

== Wednesday, December 25, 1929 ==
- The government of Saxony granted amnesty to 179 political prisoners as a Christmas gift.
- The musical film Hit the Deck premiered in Los Angeles.
- The murder case of the Lawson family took place in Germanton, North Carolina, United States

== Thursday, December 26, 1929 ==
- Pope Pius XI received royalty and nobility from the Houses of Savoy and Aosta as a gesture of goodwill marking the restoration of friendly relations between the Italian royal court and the Vatican since the Lateran Treaty.
- Died: Albert Giraud, 69, Belgian poet

== Friday, December 27, 1929 ==
- The British Foreign Office publicized a note from a Soviet ambassador promising that the USSR would refrain from communist agitation in British Dominions.

== Saturday, December 28, 1929 ==
- Black Saturday occurred in Samoa when nine demonstrators were killed by New Zealand mandate government police.
- Ogden L. Mills, the acting United States Secretary of the Treasury, announced that an accord had been reached with Germany on a payment agreement separate from the Young Plan, covering military occupation costs and mixed claims awards.
- Born: Terry Sawchuk, Canadian NHL goaltender; in Winnipeg, Manitoba (died of injuries from a fight, 1970)

== Sunday, December 29, 1929 ==
- The executive committee of the Indian National Congress called for complete independence for India.
- In the Nazi newspaper Der Angriff, Joseph Goebbels published a controversial article titled "Hindenburg, are you still alive?", accompanied by a cartoon depicting President Paul von Hindenburg as a Teutonic god sitting on a throne supported by a stereotypical Jewish figure, watching pitilessly as generations of Germans marched into slavery. Hindenburg sued Goebbels for libel over the article.
- The Archbishop of Canterbury, Cosmo Lang, made a radio broadcast from Canterbury Cathedral heard around the world calling on all British citizens to do their part for the country in 1930. "For more than a century we have taken for granted the industrial and commercial leadership of this country", he said. "Let the experience of the passing year suffice to show that this leadership is seriously threatened. Our great industries in coal, iron, steel and cotton textiles are anxious and ill at ease. Competitors have arisen to supplant us in markets in which we thought our positions assured. More than 1 million of our people are unemployed, and the future is clouded with uncertainty." The Archbishop said that the only possible remedy was not through a political solution, but by "each citizen realizing and fulfilling his own personal responsibility."
- Born:
  - Susie Garrett, actress, in Detroit (d. 2002)
  - Peter May, cricketer, in Reading, Berkshire, England (d. 1994)
- Died: Wilhelm Maybach, 83, German automobile designer

== Monday, December 30, 1929 ==
- The Cole Porter musical revue Wake Up and Dream premiered at the Selwyn Theatre on Broadway.

== Tuesday, December 31, 1929 ==
- 69 children in Scotland perished in a movie theatre fire in Paisley, Renfrewshire. None of the deaths were from the fire itself, which was quickly put out, but due to suffocation, choking from the noxious fumes of the burning celluloid or trampling in the rush to get out.
- Mahatma Gandhi made a speech before the Indian National Congress in support of a resolution calling for Indian independence. The resolution was passed unanimously.
- United States Secretary of Commerce Robert P. Lamont issued a statement predicting that 1930 would mark "a continuance of prosperity and progress." Secretary of the Treasuary Andrew W. Mellon likewise issued an optimistic statement: "During the winter months there may be some slackness or unemployment, but hardly more than is usual at this season each year. I have every confidence that there will be a revival of activity in the spring and that during the coming year the country will make steady progress."
- Born: Mies Bouwman, Dutch television presenter, in Amsterdam (d. 2018)
- Died: Charles Phelps Taft, 86, American lawyer, politician, and brother of William Howard Taft
