= Opavian Silesia =

Historical region of Czechia

Opavian Silesia Opavské Slezsko (Czech) Troppauer Schlesien/Troppauer Land (German)
- Historical region
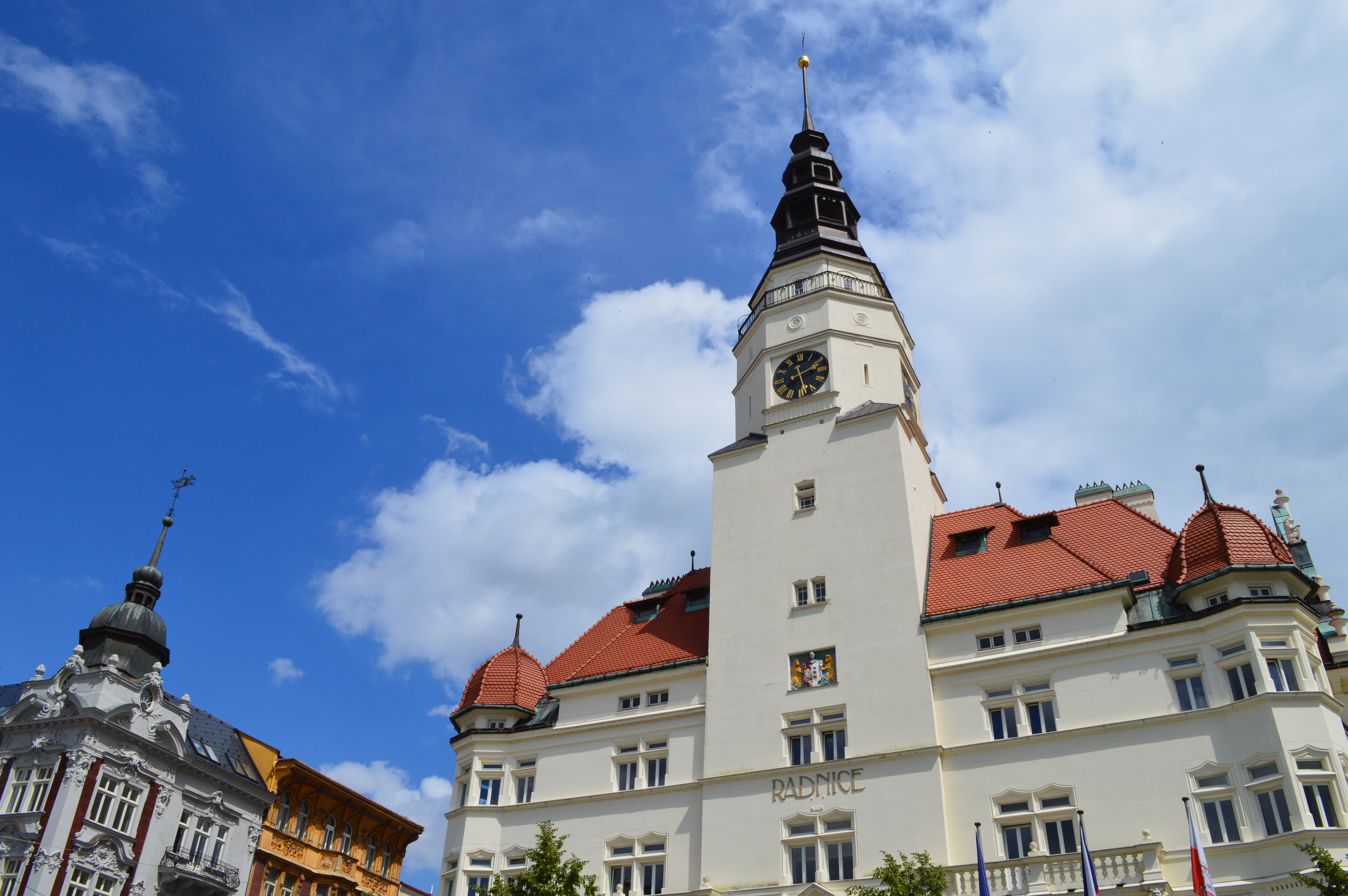
- Town hall in Opava

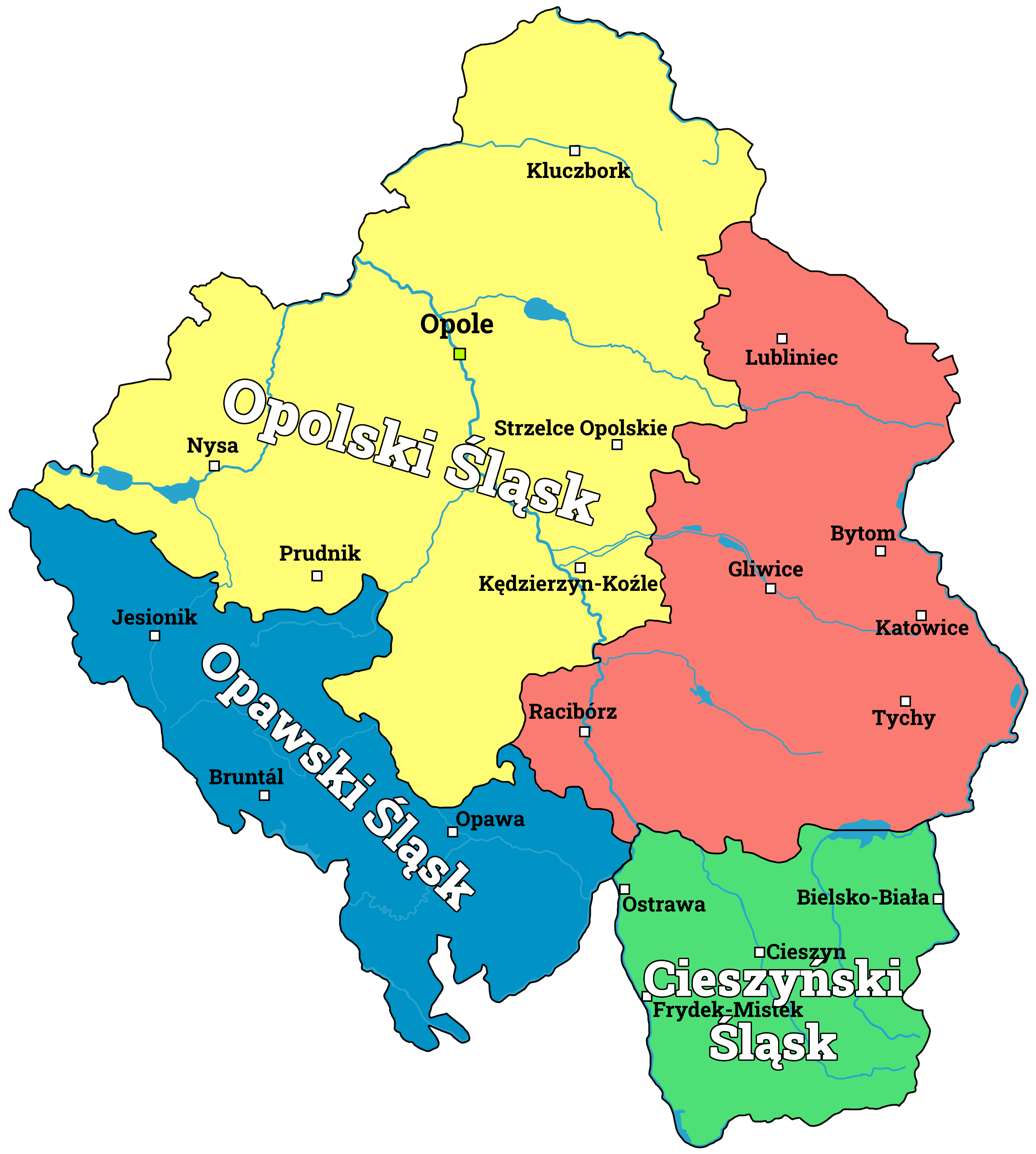
- Map of Upper Silesia, Opavian Silesia in blue
- Country: Czech Republic
- Historical capital: Opava
- Time zone: UTC+1 (CET)
  - Summer (DST): UTC+2 (CEST)

Opavian Silesia (Silesian: Ôpawski Ślōnsk, Czech: Opavské Slezsko, Polish: Śląsk Opawski or Śląsk karniowsko-opawski, German: Troppauer Schlesien or Troppauer Land) is a historical subregion of Silesia (Upper Silesia) mostly within the Czech Republic.

The historical centre of the region is Opava (Polish: Opawa, German: Troppau) and the region mostly encompasses areas of the medieval Duchy of Opava. The Hlučín Region is located within Opavian Silesia.

Formerly, Lach used to be spoken in Opavian Silesia.

== History ==
After the World War I, most of Austrian Silesia (including Opavian Silesia) became a part of the newly formed Czechoslovakia. Hlučín Region, a part of Germany, became a part of Czechoslovakia on 4 February 1920 without a referendum. This was largely due to the fact that most of the regions inhabitants spoke Czech. Głubczyce (German: Leobschütz, Czech: Hlubčice or Glubčice), a town in northern Opavian Silesia, was supposed to come under the administration of Czechoslovakia if the rest of the Upper Silesian Plebiscite area fell to Poland. That however never happened, and after the World War II Głubczyce found itself within Poland.

From 1945 to 1946, the majority of the German population of Opavian Silesia was expelled.

== See also ==
- Opava
- Duchy of Opava
- Duchy of Krnov

== Sources ==
- Maria Lipok-Bierwiaczonek. Górny Śląsk: O regionie najkrócej – historia i zróżnicowanie kulturowe. Retrieved from ibr.bs.katowice.pl.
- "Troppauer Land". orf-oberschlesien.de (in German). Retrieved October 3, 2020.
- "Troppau und das Troppauer Land". troppau-opava.de (in German). Retrieved October 3, 2020.
